= List of conjectures =

This is a list of notable mathematical conjectures.

== Open problems ==
The following conjectures remain open. The (incomplete) column "cites" lists the number of results for a Google Scholar search for the term, in double quotes as of September 2022.

Conjecture	Field	Comments	Eponym(s)	Cites
1/3–2/3 conjecture	order theory		n/a	70
abc conjecture	number theory	⇔Granville–Langevin conjecture, Vojta's conjecture in dimension 1 ⇒Erdős–Woods conjecture, Fermat–Catalan conjecture Formulated by David Masser and Joseph Oesterlé. Proof claimed in 2012 by Shinichi Mochizuki	Joseph Oesterlé and David Masser under the name "Oesterlé–Masser conjecture"	2440
Agoh–Giuga conjecture	number theory		Takashi Agoh and Giuseppe Giuga	8
Agrawal's conjecture	number theory		Manindra Agrawal	10
Andrews–Curtis conjecture	combinatorial group theory		James J. Andrews and Morton L. Curtis	358
Andrica's conjecture	number theory		Dorin Andrica	45
Artin conjecture (L-functions)	number theory		Emil Artin	650
Artin's conjecture on primitive roots	number theory	⇐generalized Riemann hypothesis ⇐Selberg conjecture B	Emil Artin	325
Bateman–Horn conjecture	number theory		Paul T. Bateman and Roger Horn	245
Baum–Connes conjecture	operator K-theory	⇒Gromov-Lawson-Rosenberg conjecture ⇒Kaplansky-Kadison conjecture ⇒Novikov conjecture	Paul Baum and Alain Connes	2670
Beal's conjecture	number theory		Andrew Beal	142
Beilinson conjecture	number theory		Alexander Beilinson	461
Berry–Tabor conjecture	geodesic flow		Michael Berry and Michael Tabor	239
Big-line-big-clique conjecture	discrete geometry			
Birch and Swinnerton-Dyer conjecture	number theory		Bryan John Birch and Peter Swinnerton-Dyer	2830
Birch–Tate conjecture	number theory		Bryan John Birch and John Tate	149
Birkhoff conjecture	integrable systems		George David Birkhoff	345
Bloch–Beilinson conjectures	number theory		Spencer Bloch and Alexander Beilinson	152
Bloch–Kato conjecture	algebraic K-theory		Spencer Bloch and Kazuya Kato	1620
Bochner–Riesz conjecture	harmonic analysis	⇒restriction conjecture⇒Kakeya maximal function conjecture⇒Kakeya dimension conjecture	Salomon Bochner and Marcel Riesz	236
Bombieri–Lang conjecture	diophantine geometry		Enrico Bombieri and Serge Lang	181
Borel conjecture	geometric topology		Armand Borel	981
Bost conjecture	geometric topology		Jean-Benoît Bost	65
Brennan conjecture	complex analysis		James E. Brennan	110
Brocard's conjecture	number theory		Henri Brocard	16
Brumer–Stark conjecture	number theory		Armand Brumer and Harold Stark	208
Bunyakovsky conjecture	number theory		Viktor Bunyakovsky	43
Carmichael totient conjecture	number theory		Robert Daniel Carmichael	
Casas-Alvero conjecture	polynomials		Eduardo Casas-Alvero	56
Catalan–Dickson conjecture on aliquot sequences	number theory		Eugène Charles Catalan and Leonard Eugene Dickson	46
Catalan's Mersenne conjecture	number theory		Eugène Charles Catalan	
Cherlin–Zilber conjecture	group theory		Gregory Cherlin and Boris Zilber	86
Chowla conjecture	Möbius function	⇒Sarnak conjecture	Sarvadaman Chowla	
Collatz conjecture	number theory		Lothar Collatz	1440
Cramér's conjecture	number theory		Harald Cramér	32
Conway's thrackle conjecture	graph theory		John Horton Conway	150
Deligne conjecture	monodromy		Pierre Deligne	788
Dittert conjecture	combinatorics		Eric Dittert	11
Eilenberg−Ganea conjecture	algebraic topology		Samuel Eilenberg and Tudor Ganea	96
Elliott–Halberstam conjecture	number theory		Peter D. T. A. Elliott and Heini Halberstam	300
Erdős–Faber–Lovász conjecture	graph theory		Paul Erdős, Vance Faber, and László Lovász	172
Erdős–Gyárfás conjecture	graph theory		Paul Erdős and András Gyárfás	37
Erdős–Straus conjecture	number theory		Paul Erdős and Ernst G. Straus	103
Farrell–Jones conjecture	geometric topology		F. Thomas Farrell and Lowell E. Jones	545
Filling area conjecture	differential geometry		n/a	60
Firoozbakht's conjecture	number theory		Farideh Firoozbakht	33
Fortune's conjecture	number theory		Reo Fortune	16
Four exponentials conjecture	number theory		n/a	110
Frankl conjecture	combinatorics		Péter Frankl	83
Gauss circle problem	number theory		Carl Friedrich Gauss	553
Gilbert–Pollack conjecture on the Steiner ratio of the Euclidean plane	metric geometry		Edgar Gilbert and Henry O. Pollak	
Gilbreath conjecture	number theory		Norman Laurence Gilbreath	34
Goldbach's conjecture	number theory	⇒The ternary Goldbach conjecture, which was the original formulation.	Christian Goldbach	5880
Gold partition conjecture	order theory		n/a	25
Goldberg–Seymour conjecture	graph theory		Mark K. Goldberg and Paul Seymour	57
Goormaghtigh conjecture	number theory		René Goormaghtigh	14
Green's conjecture	algebraic curves		Mark Lee Green	150
Grimm's conjecture	number theory		Carl Albert Grimm	46
Grothendieck–Katz p-curvature conjecture	differential equations		Alexander Grothendieck and Nick Katz	98
Hadamard conjecture	combinatorics		Jacques Hadamard	858
Herzog–Schönheim conjecture	group theory		Marcel Herzog and Jochanan Schönheim	44
Hilbert–Smith conjecture	geometric topology		David Hilbert and Paul Althaus Smith	219
Homological conjectures in commutative algebra	commutative algebra		n/a	
Ibragimov–Iosifescu conjecture for φ-mixing sequences	probability theory		Ildar Ibragimov, ro:Marius Iosifescu	
Invariant subspace problem	functional analysis		n/a	2120
Jacobson's conjecture	ring theory		Nathan Jacobson	127
Kaplansky conjectures	ring theory		Irving Kaplansky	466
Keating–Snaith conjecture	number theory		Jonathan Keating and Nina Snaith	48
Köthe conjecture	ring theory		Gottfried Köthe	167
Kung–Traub conjecture	iterative methods		H. T. Kung and Joseph F. Traub	332
Legendre's conjecture	number theory		Adrien-Marie Legendre	110
Lemoine's conjecture	number theory		Émile Lemoine	13
Lenstra–Pomerance–Wagstaff conjecture	number theory		Hendrik Lenstra, Carl Pomerance, and Samuel S. Wagstaff Jr.	32
Leopoldt's conjecture	number theory		Heinrich-Wolfgang Leopoldt	773
List coloring conjecture	graph theory		n/a	300
Littlewood conjecture	diophantine approximation	⇐Margulis conjecture	John Edensor Littlewood	1230
Lovász conjecture	graph theory		László Lovász	560
MNOP conjecture	algebraic geometry		n/a	63
Manin conjecture	diophantine geometry		Yuri Manin	338
Marshall Hall's conjecture	number theory		Marshall Hall, Jr.	44
Mazur's conjectures	diophantine geometry		Barry Mazur	97
Montgomery's pair correlation conjecture	number theory		Hugh Lowell Montgomery	77
n conjecture	number theory		n/a	126
New Mersenne conjecture	number theory		Marin Mersenne	47
Novikov conjecture	algebraic topology		Sergei Novikov	3090
Oppermann's conjecture	number theory		Ludvig Oppermann	12
Petersen coloring conjecture	graph theory		Julius Petersen	52
Pierce–Birkhoff conjecture	real algebraic geometry		Richard S. Pierce and Garrett Birkhoff	96
Pillai's conjecture	number theory		Subbayya Sivasankaranarayana Pillai	33
De Polignac's conjecture	number theory		Alphonse de Polignac	46
Quantum PCP conjecture	computational complexity			
quantum unique ergodicity conjecture	dynamical systems	2004, Elon Lindenstrauss, for arithmetic hyperbolic surfaces, 2008, Kannan Soundararajan & Roman Holowinsky, for holomorphic forms of increasing weight for Hecke eigenforms on noncompact arithmetic surfaces	n/a	281
Reconstruction conjecture	graph theory		n/a	1040
Riemann hypothesis	number theory	⇐Generalized Riemann hypothesis⇐Grand Riemann hypothesis ⇔De Bruijn–Newman constant=0 ⇒density hypothesis, Lindelöf hypothesis See Hilbert–Pólya conjecture. For other Riemann hypotheses, see the Weil conjectures (now theorems).	Bernhard Riemann	24900
Ringel–Kotzig conjecture	graph theory		Gerhard Ringel and Anton Kotzig	187
Rudin's conjecture	additive combinatorics		Walter Rudin	16
Sarnak conjecture	topological entropy		Peter Sarnak	295
Sato–Tate conjecture	number theory		Mikio Sato and John Tate	1080
Schanuel's conjecture	number theory		Stephen Schanuel	329
Schinzel's hypothesis H	number theory		Andrzej Schinzel	49
Scholz conjecture	addition chains		Arnold Scholz	41
Second Hardy–Littlewood conjecture	number theory		G. H. Hardy and John Edensor Littlewood	30
Selfridge's conjecture	number theory		John Selfridge	6
Singmaster's conjecture	binomial coefficients		David Singmaster	8
Spectral gap conjecture	ergodic theory			
Standard conjectures on algebraic cycles	algebraic geometry		n/a	234
Tate conjecture	algebraic geometry		John Tate	
Toeplitz' conjecture	Jordan curves		Otto Toeplitz	
Tuza's conjecture	graph theory		Zsolt Tuza	
Twin prime conjecture	number theory		n/a	1700
Ulam's packing conjecture	packing		Stanislaw Ulam	
Unicity conjecture for Markov numbers	number theory		Andrey Markov (by way of Markov numbers)	
Uniformity conjecture	diophantine geometry		n/a	
Unique games conjecture	computational complexity		n/a	
Kummer–Vandiver conjecture	number theory		Ernst Kummer and Harry Vandiver	
Virasoro conjecture	algebraic geometry		Miguel Ángel Virasoro	
Vizing's conjecture	graph theory		Vadim G. Vizing	
Vojta's conjecture	number theory	⇒abc conjecture	Paul Vojta	
Waring's conjecture	number theory		Edward Waring	
Weight monodromy conjecture	algebraic geometry		n/a	
Whitehead conjecture	algebraic topology		J. H. C. Whitehead	
Zauner's conjecture	operator theory		Gerhard Zauner	

== Conjectures with resolved and unresolved cases ==
The following conjectures are treated in reliable sources as having distinct recognized cases, settings, or parameter regimes with different resolution statuses. At least one such case must have been completely resolved, either affirmatively or negatively, while at least one other remains open. Results concerning only isolated special cases, individual instances, or weaker or conditional forms do not by themselves qualify. The column "cites" lists the number of results for a Google Scholar search for the term, in double quotes as of August 2026.

Conjecture	Field	Comments	Eponym(s)	Cites
Carathéodory conjecture	Differential geometry	Disproved for $C^\infty$ convex surfaces; whether the real-analytic case has been proved remains disputed	Constantin Carathéodory	185
Cartan–Hadamard conjecture	Riemannian geometry	Proved in dimensions 2, 3, and 4; open in higher dimensions	Élie Cartan and Jacques Hadamard	103
Dixmier conjecture	Abstract algebra	The generalized conjecture is false for $A_n$ with $n\geq 3$; the cases $A_1$ and $A_2$ remain open	Jacques Dixmier	267
Fuglede's conjecture	Harmonic analysis	False in dimensions 3 and higher; open in dimensions 1 and 2	Bent Fuglede	152
Generalized Poincaré conjecture	Topology	True in the topological category in all dimensions; in the PL and smooth categories some cases are resolved while others remain open	Henri Poincaré	787
Hodge conjecture	Algebraic geometry	Proved for projective complex manifolds of dimension at most 3 and for various other classes; open in general	W. V. D. Hodge	4020
Hopf conjecture	Differential geometry	The curvature-sign conjecture is proved in dimensions 2 and 4; open in even dimensions 6 and higher	Heinz Hopf	581
Jacobian conjecture	Algebraic geometry	True for $n=1$; open for $n=2$; false for $n>2$	Carl Gustav Jacob Jacobi (by way of the Jacobian determinant)	3450
Kakeya conjecture	Geometric measure theory	Proved in dimensions at most 3; open in dimensions 4 and higher	Sōichi Kakeya	776
Lonely runner conjecture	Diophantine approximation	Proved for 13 runners or fewer; open in general	—	253
Mahler conjecture	Convex geometry	Proved in dimensions 2 and 3; open in higher dimensions	Kurt Mahler	580
Serre's conjecture II	Number theory	Proved over perfect fields; over imperfect fields, cases involving anisotropic groups of types $E_6$, $E_7$, $E_8$, and trialitarian $D_4$ remain open	Jean-Pierre Serre	52
Serre's multiplicity conjectures	Commutative algebra	The dimension inequality, non-negativity, and vanishing conjectures are proved; the positivity conjecture remains open in general	Jean-Pierre Serre	7
Torsion conjecture	Arithmetic geometry	Proved for elliptic curves over number fields; the higher-dimensional abelian-variety case remains largely open	—	219
Weinstein conjecture	Symplectic geometry	Proved for all closed 3-manifolds and several broader classes; open in general	Alan Weinstein	1320

== Conjectures now proved (theorems) ==
The conjecture terminology may persist: theorems often enough may still be referred to as conjectures, using the anachronistic names.

Priority date	Proved by	Former name	Field	Comments
1962	Walter Feit and John G. Thompson	Burnside conjecture that, apart from cyclic groups, finite simple groups have even order	finite simple groups	Feit–Thompson theorem⇔trivially the "odd order theorem" that finite groups of odd order are solvable groups
1968	Gerhard Ringel and John William Theodore Youngs	Heawood conjecture	graph theory	Ringel-Youngs theorem
1971	Daniel Quillen	Adams conjecture	algebraic topology	On the J-homomorphism, proposed 1963 by Frank Adams
1973	Pierre Deligne	Weil conjectures	algebraic geometry	⇒Ramanujan–Petersson conjecture Proposed by André Weil. Deligne's theorems completed around 15 years of work on the general case.
1975	Henryk Hecht and Wilfried Schmid	Blattner's conjecture	representation theory for semisimple groups	
1975	William Haboush	Mumford conjecture	geometric invariant theory	Haboush's theorem
1976	Kenneth Appel and Wolfgang Haken	Four color theorem	graph colouring	Traditionally called a "theorem", long before the proof.
1976	Daniel Quillen; and independently by Andrei Suslin	Serre's conjecture on projective modules	polynomial rings	Quillen–Suslin theorem
1977	Alberto Calderón	Denjoy's conjecture	rectifiable curves	A result claimed in 1909 by Arnaud Denjoy, proved by Calderón as a by-product of work on Cauchy singular operators
1978	Roger Heath-Brown and Samuel James Patterson	Kummer's conjecture on cubic Gauss sums	equidistribution	
1983	Gerd Faltings	Mordell conjecture	number theory	⇐Faltings' theorem, the Shafarevich conjecture on finiteness of isomorphism classes of abelian varieties. The reduction step was by Alexey Parshin.
1983 onwards	Neil Robertson and Paul D. Seymour	Wagner's conjecture	graph theory	Now generally known as the graph minor theorem.
1983	Michel Raynaud	Manin–Mumford conjecture	diophantine geometry	The Tate–Voloch conjecture is a quantitative (diophantine approximation) derived conjecture for p-adic varieties.
c.1984	Collective work	Smith conjecture	knot theory	Based on work of William Thurston on hyperbolic structures on 3-manifolds, with results by William Meeks and Shing-Tung Yau on minimal surfaces in 3-manifolds, also with Hyman Bass, Cameron Gordon, Peter Shalen, and Rick Litherland, written up by Bass and John Morgan.
1984	Louis de Branges de Bourcia	Bieberbach conjecture, 1916	complex analysis	⇐Robertson conjecture⇐Milin conjecture⇐de Branges's theorem
1984	Gunnar Carlsson	Segal's conjecture	homotopy theory	
1984	Haynes Miller	Sullivan conjecture	classifying spaces	Miller proved the version on mapping BG to a finite complex.
1987	Grigory Margulis	Oppenheim conjecture	diophantine approximation	Margulis proved the conjecture with ergodic theory methods.
1989	Vladimir I. Chernousov	Weil's conjecture on Tamagawa numbers	algebraic groups	The problem, based on Siegel's theory for quadratic forms, submitted to a long series of case analysis steps.
1990	Ken Ribet	epsilon conjecture	modular forms	
1992	Richard Borcherds	Conway–Norton conjecture	sporadic groups	Usually called monstrous moonshine
1994	David Harbater and Michel Raynaud	Abhyankar's conjecture	algebraic geometry	
1994	Andrew Wiles	Fermat's Last Theorem	number theory	⇔The modularity theorem for semistable elliptic curves. Proof completed with Richard Taylor.
1994	Fred Galvin	Dinitz conjecture	combinatorics	
1995	Doron Zeilberger	Alternating sign matrix conjecture,	enumerative combinatorics	
1996	Vladimir Voevodsky	Milnor conjecture	algebraic K-theory	Voevodsky's theorem, ⇐norm residue isomorphism theorem⇔Beilinson–Lichtenbaum conjecture, Quillen–Lichtenbaum conjecture. The ambiguous term "Bloch-Kato conjecture" may refer to what is now the norm residue isomorphism theorem.
1998	Thomas Callister Hales	Kepler conjecture	sphere packing	
1998	Thomas Callister Hales and Sean McLaughlin	dodecahedral conjecture	Voronoi decompositions	
2000	Krzysztof Kurdyka, Tadeusz Mostowski, and Adam Parusiński	Gradient conjecture	gradient vector fields	Attributed to René Thom, c.1970.
2001	Christophe Breuil, Brian Conrad, Fred Diamond and Richard Taylor	Taniyama–Shimura conjecture	elliptic curves	Now the modularity theorem for elliptic curves. Once known as the "Weil conjecture".
2001	Mark Haiman	n! conjecture	representation theory	
2001	Daniel Frohardt and Kay Magaard	Guralnick–Thompson conjecture	monodromy groups	
2002	Preda Mihăilescu	Catalan's conjecture, 1844	exponential diophantine equations	⇐Pillai's conjecture⇐abc conjecture Mihăilescu's theorem
2002	Maria Chudnovsky, Neil Robertson, Paul D. Seymour, and Robin Thomas	strong perfect graph conjecture	perfect graphs	Chudnovsky–Robertson–Seymour–Thomas theorem
2002	Grigori Perelman	Poincaré conjecture, 1904	3-manifolds	
2003	Grigori Perelman	geometrization conjecture of Thurston	3-manifolds	⇒spherical space form conjecture
2003	Ben Green; and independently by Alexander Sapozhenko	Cameron–Erdős conjecture	sum-free sets	
2003	Nils Dencker	Nirenberg–Treves conjecture	pseudo-differential operators	
2004 (see comment)	Nobuo Iiyori and Hiroshi Yamaki	Frobenius conjecture	group theory	A consequence of the classification of finite simple groups, completed in 2004 by the usual standards of pure mathematics.
2004	Adam Marcus and Gábor Tardos	Stanley–Wilf conjecture	permutation classes	Marcus–Tardos theorem
2004	Ualbai U. Umirbaev and Ivan P. Shestakov	Nagata's conjecture on automorphisms	polynomial rings	
2004	Ian Agol; and independently by Danny Calegari–David Gabai	tameness conjecture	geometric topology	⇒Ahlfors measure conjecture
2008	Avraham Trahtman	Road coloring conjecture	graph theory	
2008	Chandrashekhar Khare and Jean-Pierre Wintenberger	Serre's modularity conjecture	modular forms	
2009	Jeremy Kahn and Vladimir Markovic	surface subgroup conjecture	3-manifolds	⇒Ehrenpreis conjecture on quasiconformality
2009	Jeremie Chalopin and Daniel Gonçalves	Scheinerman's conjecture	intersection graphs	
2010	Terence Tao and Van H. Vu	circular law	random matrix theory	
2011	Joel Friedman; and independently by Igor Mineyev	Hanna Neumann conjecture	group theory	
2012	Simon Brendle	Hsiang–Lawson's conjecture	differential geometry	
2012	Fernando Codá Marques and André Neves	Willmore conjecture	differential geometry	
2013	Yitang Zhang	bounded gap conjecture	number theory	The sequence of gaps between consecutive prime numbers has a finite lim inf. See Polymath Project#Polymath8 for quantitative results.
2013	Adam Marcus, Daniel Spielman and Nikhil Srivastava	Kadison–Singer problem	functional analysis	The original problem posed by Kadison and Singer was not a conjecture: its authors believed it false. As reformulated, it became the "paving conjecture" for Euclidean spaces, and then a question on random polynomials, in which latter form it was solved affirmatively.
2013	Harald Helfgott	Goldbach's weak conjecture	number theory	
2015	Jean Bourgain, Ciprian Demeter, and Larry Guth	Main conjecture in Vinogradov's mean-value theorem	analytic number theory	Bourgain–Demeter–Guth theorem, ⇐ decoupling theorem
2018	Karim Adiprasito	g-conjecture	combinatorics	
2019	Dimitris Koukoulopoulos and James Maynard	Duffin–Schaeffer conjecture	number theory	Rational approximation of irrational numbers
2019	Hao Huang	Sensitivity conjecture	computational complexity	
2026	Lech Mazur	Sendov's conjecture	complex analysis	With assitance of GPT-5.6 Pro.

- Deligne's conjecture on 1-motives

== Disproved (no longer conjectures) ==
The conjectures in the following list were not necessarily generally accepted as true before being disproved.

- Aharoni-Korman conjecture also known as the fishbone conjecture
- Atiyah conjecture (not a conjecture to start with)
- Borsuk's conjecture
- Bunkbed conjecture
- Chinese hypothesis (not a conjecture to start with)
- Comon's conjecture
- Doomsday conjecture
- Euler's sum of powers conjecture
- Ganea conjecture
- Generalized Smith conjecture
- Hauptvermutung
- Hedetniemi's conjecture, counterexample announced 2019
- Hirsch conjecture (disproved 2010)
- Kaplansky unit conjecture
- Intersection graph conjecture
- Kelvin's conjecture
- Kouchnirenko's conjecture
- Mertens conjecture
- Pólya conjecture, 1919 (1958)
- Ragsdale conjecture
- Schoenflies conjecture (disproved 1910)
- Tait's conjecture
- Von Neumann conjecture
- Weyl–Berry conjecture
- Williamson conjecture

== Refutations of conventional wisdom ==
In contemporary mathematics, ideas are supposedly not accepted absent rigorous proof. Historically, some statements that were generally accepted were then shown to be false.

- The idea of the Pythagoreans that all numbers can be expressed as a ratio of two whole numbers. This was disproved by one of Pythagoras' own disciples, Hippasus, who showed that the square root of two is what we today call an irrational number. One story claims that he was thrown off the ship in which he and some other Pythagoreans were sailing because his discovery was too heretical.
- Euclid's parallel postulate stated that if two lines cross a third in a plane in such a way that the sum of the "interior angles" is not 180° then the two lines meet. Furthermore, he implicitly assumed that two separate intersecting lines meet at only one point. These assumptions were believed to be true for more than 2000 years, but in light of General Relativity at least the second can no longer be considered true. In fact the very notion of a straight line in four-dimensional curved space-time has to be redefined, which one can do as a geodesic. (But the notion of a plane does not carry over.) It is now recognized that Euclidean geometry can be studied as a mathematical abstraction, but that the universe is non-Euclidean.
- Fermat conjectured that all numbers of the form $2^{2^m}+1$ (known as Fermat numbers) were prime. However, this conjecture was disproved by Euler, who found that $2^{2^5}+1=4,294,967,297 = 641 \times 6,700,417.$
- The idea that transcendental numbers were unusual. Disproved by Georg Cantor who showed that there are so many transcendental numbers that it is impossible to make a one-to-one mapping between them and the algebraic numbers. In other words, the cardinality of the set of transcendentals (denoted $\beth_1$) is greater than that of the set of algebraic numbers ($\aleph_0$).
- Bernhard Riemann, at the end of his famous 1859 paper "On the Number of Primes Less Than a Given Magnitude", stated (based on his results) that the logarithmic integral gives a somewhat too high estimate of the prime-counting function. The evidence also seemed to indicate this. However, in 1914 J. E. Littlewood proved that this was not always the case, and in fact it is now known that the first x for which $\pi(x) > \mathrm{li}(x)$ occurs somewhere before 10^{317}. See Skewes' number for more detail.
- Naïvely it might be expected that a continuous function must have a derivative or else that the set of points where it is not differentiable should be "small" in some sense. This was disproved in 1872 by Karl Weierstrass, and in fact examples had been found earlier of functions that were nowhere differentiable (see Weierstrass function). According to Weierstrass in his paper, earlier mathematicians including Gauss had often assumed that such functions did not exist.
- It was conjectured in 1919 by George Pólya, based on the evidence, that most numbers less than any particular limit have an odd number of prime factors. However, this Pólya conjecture was disproved in 1958. It turns out that for some values of the limit (such as values a bit more than 906 million), most numbers less than the limit have an even number of prime factors.

== See also ==
- Erdős conjectures
- Fuglede's conjecture
- Millennium Prize Problems
- Painlevé conjecture
- Mathematical fallacy
- Superseded theories in science
- List of incomplete proofs
- List of unsolved problems in mathematics
- List of disproved mathematical ideas
- List of unsolved problems
- List of lemmas
- List of theorems
- List of statements undecidable in ZFC
