= Mills' constant =

Prime-generating mathematical constant

In number theory, Mills' constant is defined as the smallest positive real number $A$ such that

$$\lfloor A^{3^{n}} \rfloor$$

is a prime number for all positive natural numbers $n$ (where $\lfloor - \rfloor$ denotes the floor function). This constant is named after William Harold Mills who in 1947 proved the existence of $A$ based on results of Guido Hoheisel and Albert Ingham on prime gaps. Its value is unproven, but if the Riemann hypothesis is true, it is approximately

$$1.3063778838630806904686144926\dots$$

(sequence A051021 in the OEIS).

== Mills primes ==
The primes generated by Mills' constant are known as Mills primes; if the Riemann hypothesis is true, the sequence begins

$$2, 11, 1361, 2521008887, 16022236204009818131831320183,$$
$$4113101149215104800030529537915953170486139623539759933135949994882770404074832568499, \ldots$$

(sequence A051254 in the OEIS). If $a_i$ denotes the $i$th prime in this sequence, then $a_i$ can be calculated as the smallest prime number larger than $a_{i-1}^3$. In order to ensure that rounding $A^{3^n}$ for all $n\geq 1$ produces this sequence of primes, it must be the case that $a_i < (a_{i-1}+1)^3$. The Hoheisel–Ingham results guarantee that there exists a prime between any two sufficiently large cube numbers, which is sufficient to prove this inequality if we start from a sufficiently large first prime $a_1$. The Riemann hypothesis implies that there exists a prime between any two consecutive cubes, allowing the sufficiently large condition to be removed, and allowing the sequence of Mills primes to begin at $a_1=2$.

For all $a_i > e^{e^{32.537}}$, there is at least one prime between $a_i^3$ and $(a_i+1)^3$. This upper bound is much too large to be practical, as it is infeasible to check every number below that figure. However, the value of Mills' constant can be verified by calculating the first prime in the sequence that is greater than that figure.

As of April 2017, the 11th number in the sequence is the largest one that has been proved prime. It is

$$\displaystyle (((((((((2^3+3)^3+30)^3+6)^3+80)^3+12)^3+450)^3+894)^3+3636)^3+70756)^3+97220$$

and has 20562 digits.

As of 2024, the largest known Mills probable prime (under the Riemann hypothesis) is

$$\begin{align}
\displaystyle &(((((((((((((2^3+3)^3+30)^3+6)^3+80)^3+12)^3+450)^3+894)^3+3636)^3+{} \\[3mu]
&\qquad 70756)^3+97220)^3+66768)^3+300840)^3+1623568)^3+8436308
\end{align}$$

(sequence A108739 in the OEIS), which is 1,665,461 digits long.

== Numerical calculation ==
By calculating the sequence of Mills primes, one can approximate Mills' constant as

$$A\approx a_n^{1/3^n}.$$

Caldwell and Cheng used this method to compute 6850 base 10 digits of Mills' constant under the assumption that the Riemann hypothesis is true. Mills' constant is not known to have a closed-form formula, but it is known to be irrational. In addition, it is either transcendental (which would be implied by Cramér's conjecture) or the $3^n$-th root of a cubic Pisot–Vijayaraghavan number.

== Generalisations ==
There is nothing special about the middle exponent value of 3. It is possible to produce similar prime-generating functions for different middle exponent values. In fact, for any real number above 2.106..., it is possible to find a different constant $A$ that will work with this middle exponent to always produce primes. Moreover, if Legendre's conjecture is true, the middle exponent can be replaced with value 2 (sequence A059784 in the OEIS). Matomäki showed unconditionally (without assuming Legendre's conjecture) the existence of a (possibly large) constant $A$ such that $\lfloor A^{2^{n}} \rfloor$ is prime for all $n$. In contrast to Mills' constant, it is unknown if the smallest such $A$ is irrational; the analogous constant where the middle exponent is an integer $\geq 4$ is always transcendental.

Additionally, Tóth proved that the floor function in the formula could be replaced with the ceiling function, so that there exists a constant $B$ such that

$$\lceil B^{r^{n}} \rceil$$

is also prime-representing for $r>2.106,\ r\in N\dots$ In the case $r=3$, the value of the constant $B$ begins with 1.24055470525201424067... The first few primes generated are:

$$2, 7, 337, 38272739, 56062005704198360319209, 176199995814327287356671209104585864397055039072110696028654438846269, \ldots$$

Without assuming the Riemann hypothesis, Elsholtz proved that $\lfloor A^{10^{10n}} \rfloor$ is prime for all positive integers n, where $A \approx 1.00536773279814724017$, and that $\lfloor B^{3^{13n}} \rfloor$ is prime for all positive integers n, where $B \approx 3.8249998073439146171615551375$.

Duc-Son Tran proved that in Tóth's result above, the number r can be replaced by any real number $> 8/3$. Moreover, he demonstrated another result stating that for any given real number $B > 1$, there exists a number r such that $\lceil B^{r^{n}} \rceil$ is also prime-representing.

== See also ==
- Formula for primes
