= Lindelöf hypothesis =

Mathematical conjecture on the Riemann zeta function

In mathematics, the Lindelöf hypothesis is a conjecture by Finnish mathematician Ernst Leonard Lindelöf about the rate of growth of the Riemann zeta function on the critical line. This hypothesis is implied by the Riemann hypothesis. It says that for any ε > 0,
$$\zeta\!\left(\frac{1}{2} + it\right)\! = O(t^\varepsilon)$$
as t tends to infinity (see big O notation). Since ε can be replaced by a smaller value, the conjecture can be restated as follows: for any positive ε,
$$\zeta\!\left(\frac{1}{2} + it\right)\! = o(t^\varepsilon).$$

== The μ function ==
If σ is real, then μ(σ) is defined to be the infimum of all real numbers a such that ζ(σ + iT ) = O(T^{a}). It is trivial to check that μ(σ) = 0 for σ > 1, and the functional equation of the zeta function implies that μ(σ) = μ(1 − σ) − σ + 1/2. The Phragmén–Lindelöf theorem implies that μ is a convex function. The Lindelöf hypothesis states μ(1/2) = 0, which together with the above properties of μ implies that μ(σ) is 0 for σ ≥ 1/2 and 1/2 − σ for σ ≤ 1/2.

Lindelöf's convexity result together with μ(1) = 0 and μ(0) = 1/2 implies that 0 ≤ μ(1/2) ≤ 1/4. The upper bound of 1/4 was lowered by Hardy and Littlewood to 1/6 by applying Weyl's method of estimating exponential sums to the approximate functional equation. It has since been lowered to slightly less than 1/6 by several authors using long and technical proofs, as in the following table.

| μ(1/2) ≤ | μ(1/2) ≤ | Author |
|---|---|---|
| 1/4 | 0.25 | Lindelöf 1908 (convexity bound) |
| 1/6 | 0.1667 | Hardy & Littlewood 1916, 1923 |
| 163/988 | 0.1650 | Walfisz 1924 |
| 27/164 | 0.1647 | Titchmarsh 1932 |
| 229/1392 | 0.164512 | Phillips 1933 |
| | 0.164511 | Rankin 1955 |
| 19/116 | 0.1638 | Titchmarsh 1942 |
| 15/92 | 0.1631 | Min 1949 |
| 6/37 | 0.16217 | Haneke 1962 |
| 173/1067 | 0.16214 | Kolesnik 1973 |
| 35/216 | 0.16204 | Kolesnik 1982 |
| 139/858 | 0.16201 | Kolesnik 1985 |
| 9/56 | 0.1608 | Bombieri & Iwaniec 1986 |
| 32/205 | 0.1561 | Huxley 2002, 2005 |
| 53/342 | 0.1550 | Bourgain 2017 |
| 13/84 | 0.1548 | Bourgain 2017 |

== Relation to the Riemann hypothesis ==
Backlund (1918–1919) showed that the Lindelöf hypothesis is equivalent to the following statement about the zeros of the zeta function: for every ε > 0, the number of zeros with real part at least 1/2 + ε and imaginary part between T and T + 1 is o(log(T)) as T tends to infinity. The Riemann hypothesis implies that there are no zeros at all in this region and so implies the Lindelöf hypothesis. The number of zeros with imaginary part between T and T + 1 is known to be O(log(T)), so the Lindelöf hypothesis seems only slightly stronger than what has already been proved, but in spite of this it has resisted all attempts to prove it.

== Means of powers (or moments) of the zeta function ==
The Lindelöf hypothesis is equivalent to the statement that
$$\frac{1}{T} \int_0^T|\zeta(1/2+it)|^{2k}\,dt = O(T^{\varepsilon})$$
for all positive integers k and all positive real numbers ε. This has been proved for k = 1 or 2, but the case k = 3 seems much harder and is still an open problem.

There is a much more precise conjecture about the asymptotic behavior of the integral: it is believed that

$$\int_0^T|\zeta(1/2+it)|^{2k} \, dt = T\sum_{j=0}^{k^2}c_{k,j}\log(T)^{k^2-j} + o(T)$$

for some constants c_{k, j}. This has been proved by Littlewood for k = 1 and by Heath-Brown for k = 2 (extending a result of Ingham who found the leading term).

Conrey and Ghosh suggested the value

$$\frac{42}{9!}\prod_ p \left((1-p^{-1})^4(1+4p^{-1}+p^{-2})\right)$$

for the leading coefficient when k is 3, and Keating and Snaith used random matrix theory to suggest some conjectures for the values of the coefficients for higher k. The leading coefficients are conjectured to be the product of an elementary factor, a certain product over primes, and the number of n × n Young tableaux given by the sequence

1, 1, 2, 42, 24024, 701149020, ... (sequence A039622 in the OEIS).

== Other consequences ==
Denoting by p_{n} the n-th prime number, let $g_n = p_{n + 1} - p_n.\$ A result by Albert Ingham shows that the Lindelöf hypothesis implies that, for any ε > 0,
$$g_n\ll p_n^{1/2+\varepsilon}$$
if n is sufficiently large.

A prime gap conjecture stronger than Ingham's result is Cramér's conjecture, which asserts that
$$g_n = O\!\left((\log p_n)^2\right).$$

=== The density hypothesis ===
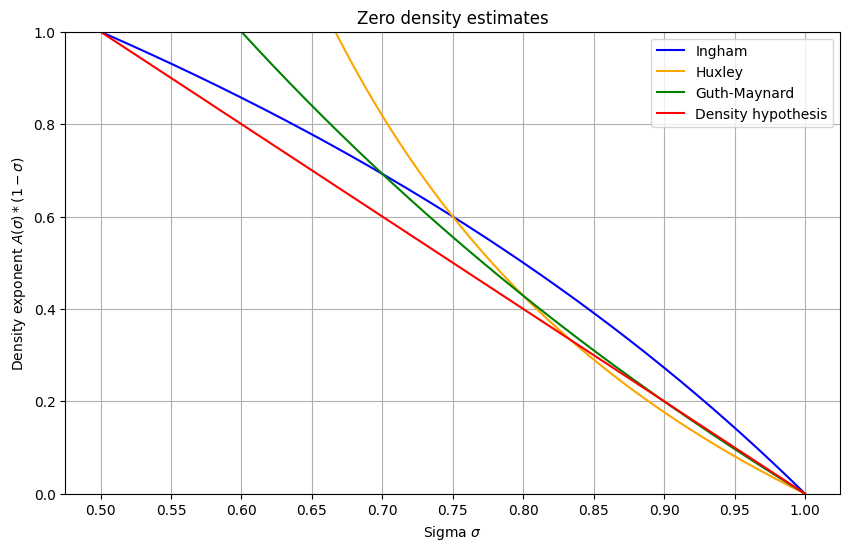
The known zero-free region roughly speaking corresponds to the bottom right corner of the image, and the Riemann hypothesis would push the entire diagram down to the x-axis $A_{RH}(\sigma>1/2)=0$. At the other extreme, the upper boundary $A_{DH}(1-\sigma)=2(1-1/2)=1$ of this diagram corresponds to the trivial bound coming from the Riemann-von Mangoldt formula.(Various other estimates do exist)

The density hypothesis says that $N(\sigma,T)\le N^{2(1-\sigma)+\epsilon}$, where $N(\sigma,T)$ denote the number of zeros $\rho$ of $\zeta(s)$with $\mathfrak{R}(s)\ge \sigma$ and $|\mathfrak{I}(s)|\le T$, and it would follow from the Lindelöf hypothesis.

More generally let $N(\sigma,T)\le N^{A(\sigma)(1-\sigma)+\epsilon}$ then it is known that this bound roughly correspond to asymptotics for primes in short intervals of length $x^{1-1/A(\sigma)}$.

Ingham showed that $A_I(\sigma)=\frac{3}{2-\sigma}$ in 1940, Huxley that $A_H(\sigma)=\frac{3}{3\sigma-1}$ in 1971, and Guth and Maynard that $A_{GM}(\sigma)=\frac{15}{5\sigma+3}$ in 2024 (preprint) and these coincide on
$$\sigma_{I,GM}=7/10<\sigma_{H,GM}=8/10<\sigma_{I,H}=3/4.$$
Therefore the latest work of Guth and Maynard gives the closest known value to $\sigma=1/2$ (as expected from the Riemann hypothesis) and improves the bound to $N(\sigma,T)\le N^{\frac{30}{13}(1-\sigma)+\epsilon}$ or equivalently the asymptotics to $x^{17/30}$.

In theory, improvements to Baker, Harman, and Pintz estimates for the Legendre conjecture and better Siegel-zero-free regions could also be expected, among others.

== L-functions ==
The Riemann zeta function belongs to a more general family of functions called L-functions. In 2010, new methods to obtain sub-convexity estimates for L-functions in the PGL(2) case were given by Joseph Bernstein and Andre Reznikov and in the GL(1) and GL(2) case by Akshay Venkatesh and Philippe Michel and in 2021 for the GL(n) case by Paul Nelson.

== See also ==
- Z function#The Lindelöf hypothesis

== Notes and references ==
- Backlund, R. (1918–1919), "Über die Beziehung zwischen Anwachsen und Nullstellen der Zeta-Funktion", Ofversigt Finska Vetensk. Soc., 61 (9)
- Bourgain, Jean (2017), "Decoupling, exponential sums and the Riemann zeta function", Journal of the American Mathematical Society, 30 (1): 205–224, arXiv:1408.5794, doi:10.1090/jams/860, MR 3556291, S2CID 118064221
- Conrey, J. B.; Farmer, D. W.; Keating, Jonathan P.; Rubinstein, M. O.; Snaith, N. C. (2005), "Integral moments of L-functions", Proceedings of the London Mathematical Society, Third Series, 91 (1): 33–104, arXiv:math/0206018, doi:10.1112/S0024611504015175, ISSN 0024-6115, MR 2149530, S2CID 1435033
- Conrey, J. B.; Farmer, D. W.; Keating, Jonathan P.; Rubinstein, M. O.; Snaith, N. C. (2008), "Lower order terms in the full moment conjecture for the Riemann zeta function", Journal of Number Theory, 128 (6): 1516–1554, arXiv:math/0612843, doi:10.1016/j.jnt.2007.05.013, ISSN 0022-314X, MR 2419176, S2CID 15922788
- Conrey, J. B.; Ghosh, A. (1998), "A conjecture for the sixth power moment of the Riemann zeta-function", International Mathematics Research Notices, 1998 (15): 775–780, arXiv:math/9807187, Bibcode:1998math......7187C, doi:10.1155/S1073792898000476, ISSN 1073-7928, MR 1639551
- Edwards, H. M. (1974), Riemann's Zeta Function, New York: Dover Publications, ISBN 978-0-486-41740-0, MR 0466039 2001 pbk reprint
- Heath-Brown, D. R. (1979), "The fourth power moment of the Riemann zeta function", Proceedings of the London Mathematical Society, Third Series, 38 (3): 385–422, doi:10.1112/plms/s3-38.3.385, ISSN 0024-6115, MR 0532980
- Huxley, M. N. (2002), "Integer points, exponential sums and the Riemann zeta function", Number theory for the millennium, II (Urbana, IL, 2000), A K Peters, pp. 275–290, MR 1956254
- Huxley, M. N. (2005), "Exponential sums and the Riemann zeta function. V", Proceedings of the London Mathematical Society, Third Series, 90 (1): 1–41, doi:10.1112/S0024611504014959, ISSN 0024-6115, MR 2107036
- Ingham, A. E. (1928), "Mean-Value Theorems in the Theory of the Riemann Zeta-Function", Proc. London Math. Soc., s2-27 (1): 273–300, doi:10.1112/plms/s2-27.1.273
- Ingham, A. E. (1940), "On the estimation of N(σ,T)", The Quarterly Journal of Mathematics, Second Series, 11 (1): 291–292, Bibcode:1940QJMat..11..201I, doi:10.1093/qmath/os-11.1.201, ISSN 0033-5606, MR 0003649
- Karatsuba, Anatoly; Voronin, Sergei (1992), The Riemann zeta-function, de Gruyter Expositions in Mathematics, vol. 5, Berlin: Walter de Gruyter & Co., ISBN 978-3-11-013170-3, MR 1183467
- Keating, Jonathan P.; Snaith, N. C. (2000), "Random matrix theory and ζ(1/2+it)", Communications in Mathematical Physics, 214 (1): 57–89, Bibcode:2000CMaPh.214...57K, doi:10.1007/s002200000261, ISSN 0010-3616, MR 1794265, S2CID 11095649
- Lindelöf, Ernst (1908), "Quelques remarques sur la croissance de la fonction ζ(s)", Bull. Sci. Math., 32: 341–356
- Motohashi, Yõichi (1995), "A relation between the Riemann zeta-function and the hyperbolic Laplacian", Annali della Scuola Normale Superiore di Pisa. Classe di Scienze. Serie IV, 22 (2): 299–313, ISSN 0391-173X, MR 1354909
- Motohashi, Yõichi (1995), "The Riemann zeta-function and the non-Euclidean Laplacian", Sugaku Expositions, 8 (1): 59–87, ISSN 0898-9583, MR 1335956
- Titchmarsh, Edward Charles (1986), The theory of the Riemann zeta-function (2nd ed.), The Clarendon Press Oxford University Press, ISBN 978-0-19-853369-6, MR 0882550
- Voronin, S.M. (2001) [1994], "Lindelöf hypothesis", Encyclopedia of Mathematics, EMS Press
