= Brocard's conjecture =

Mathematical conjecture

Unsolved problem in mathematics
Are there at least 4 prime numbers between two consecutive squared prime numbers?
More unsolved problems in mathematics

In number theory, Brocard's conjecture is the conjecture that there are at least four prime numbers between (p_{n})^{2} and (p_{n+1})^{2}, where p_{n} is the n^{th} prime number, for every n ≥ 2. The conjecture is named after Henri Brocard. It is widely believed that this conjecture is true. However, it remains unproven as of 2025. Legendre's conjecture, which states that there is a prime between consecutive integer squares, directly implies that there are at least two primes between prime squares for p_{n} ≥ 3 since p_{n+1} − p_{n} ≥ 2.

== Mathematical statement ==
Let $p_n$ be the $n$-th prime, and let $\pi(x)$ be the number of prime numbers $\leq x$. Formally, Brocard's conjecture claims:

$\pi\big((p_{n+1})^2\big)-\pi\big((p_n)^2\big)\geq 4\quad\text{for }n\geq2$

This is equivalent to saying that there are at least four primes between squared consecutive primes other than $2$ and $3$.

== Relation to other open problems in mathematics ==
=== Legendre's conjecture ===
Legendre's conjecture claims that there is a prime number between $(n)^2$ and $(n+1)^2$ for all natural number $n$. It is an unsolved problem in mathematics as of 2025. If Legendre's conjecture is true, it immediately implies a weak version of Brocard's conjecture:

$\pi\big((p_{n+1})^2\big)-\pi\big((p_n)^2\big)\geq 2\quad\text{for }n\geq 3$

=== Cramér's conjecture ===
Cramér's conjecture claims that $p_{n+1}-p_n=O((\log p_n)^2)$, which gives a bound on how far apart primes can be. Cramér's conjecture implies Brocard's conjecture for sufficiently large $n$.

=== Oppermann's conjecture ===
Oppermann's conjecture claims that there is a prime in the interval $(n^2, n(n+1))$ and in the interval $(n(n+1), (n+1)^2)$. This unsolved problem directly implies Brocard's conjecture.

Proof that Oppermann's Conjecture implies Brocard's Conjecture

We begin with the fact that $p_{n+1}-p_n\geq 2$, meaning that the minimal interval between primes is $(p_n, p_n+2)$. Then, according to Oppermann's conjecture, there is a prime in the interval $(p_n^2, p_n(p_n+1))$, a prime in the interval $(p_n(p_n+1), (p_n+1)^2)$, a prime in the interval $((p_n+1)^2, (p_n+1)(p_n+2))$, and a prime in the interval $((p_n+1)(p_n+2), (p_n+2)^2)$. Then, we have:

$\underbrace{\big(p_n^2, p_n(p_n+1)\big)}_{\text{At least }1\text{ prime}},\quad \underbrace{\big(p_n(p_n+1), (p_n+1)^2\big)}_{\text{At least } 1 \text{ prime}}, \quad \underbrace{\big((p_n+1)^2, (p_n+1)(p_n+2)\big)}_{\text{At least }1\text{ prime}}, \quad \underbrace{\big((p_n+1)(p_n+2), (p_n+2)^2\big)}_{\text{At least }1\text{ prime}}$

Which implies at least $4$ primes between $p_n^2$ and $(p_n+2)^2$, and because $p_n+2\leq p_{n+1}$, there are at least $4$ primes between any two squared consecutive primes, which is exactly what Brocard's conjecture claims.

== Examples ==
n	$p_n$	$p_n^2$	Prime numbers	$\Delta$
1	2	4	5, 7	2
2	3	9	11, 13, 17, 19, 23	5
3	5	25	29, 31, 37, 41, 43, 47	6
4	7	49	53, 59, 61, 67, 71, ...	15
5	11	121	127, 131, 137, 139, 149, ...	9
$\Delta$ stands for $\pi(p_{n+1}^2) - \pi(p_n^2)$.

The equation $\pi\big((p_{n+1})^2\big)-\pi\big((p_n)^2\big)$ graphed up to $n=30$. The dotted line is the threshold that Brocard's conjecture claims to hold for all $n\geq 2$.

It is easy to verify the conjecture for small $n$:

$\pi\big(5^2\big)-\pi\big(3^2\big)=9-4\geq 4, \quad \pi\big(7^2\big)-\pi\big(5^2\big)=15-9\geq 4$

The number of primes between prime squares is 2, 5, 6, 15, 9, 22, 11, 27, ... OEIS: A050216. See the table (right) for a list of primes sorted by the difference. See the animation (right) for the first 30 differences.

== Current research and results ==
=== Unconditional results ===
==== Bertrand's postulate ====
A trivial result from Bertrand's postulate, a proven theorem, states that because there is a prime in the interval $(n, 2n)$, and the length of the interval $((p_n)^2, (p_{n+1})^2)$ is much greater than $(p_n, 2p_n)$, Bertrand's postulate suggests many primes in the interval $((p_n)^2, (p_{n+1})^2)$, though not a sharp bound.

==== Baker-Harman-Pintz bound ====
Using the bound proven by Baker et al., that $p_{n+1}-p_n<p_n^{0.525}$, one can show that there exist infinitely many $p_n$ such that there is at least one prime in the interval $((p_n)^2, (p_{n+1})^2)$, which is a much weaker result than Brocard's conjecture.

=== Conditional results ===
==== Legendre's Conjecture - weak version of Brocard's conjecture ====
As shown above, Legendre's conjecture implies a weak version of Brocard's conjecture but is a strictly weaker conjecture.

==== Oppermann's Conjecture - full proof of Brocard's conjecture ====
As shown above, Oppermann's conjecture directly implies Brocard's conjecture for large enough $n$, which constitutes a proof of Brocard's conjecture.

==== Cramér's Conjecture - full proof of Brocard's conjecture ====
As shown above, Cramér's conjecture implies Brocard's conjecture directly.

==== The Riemann Hypothesis - full proof of Brocard's conjecture ====
The Riemann Hypothesis implies the bound $p_{n+1}-p_n=O\big(\sqrt{p_n}\log(p_n)\big)$, which implies Brocard's conjecture for sufficiently large $n$, similarly to Cramér's conjecture.

== See also ==
- Prime-counting function
- Legendre's conjecture
- Oppermann's conjecture
- Cramér's conjecture
- Riemann hypothesis
- Henri Brocard
- Big-O Notation
- Bertrand's postulate
