= Firoozbakht's conjecture =

Bound on the gaps between prime numbers

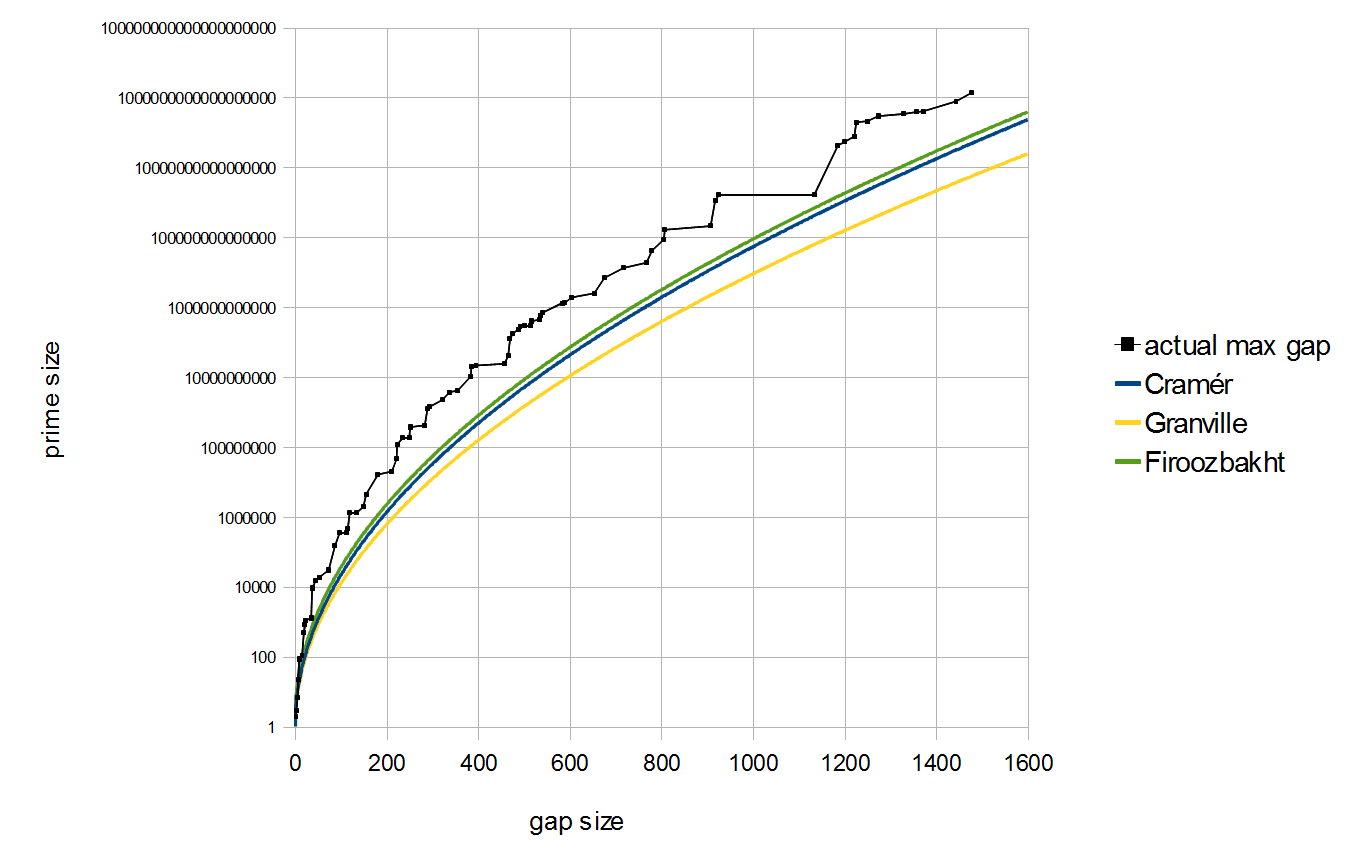
Prime gap function

In number theory, Firoozbakht's conjecture (or the Firoozbakht conjecture) is a conjecture about the distribution of prime numbers. It is named after the Iranian mathematician Farideh Firoozbakht, who stated it in 1982.

The conjecture states that $\sqrt[n]{p_n}$ (where $p_n$ is the $n$-th prime) is a strictly decreasing function of $n$; i.e.,

$$\sqrt[n+1]{p_{n+1}} < \sqrt[n]{p_n}$$

for all $n\geq 1$. Equivalently, $p_{n+1} < p_n^{1+1/n}$. See OEIS: A182134, OEIS: A246782.

By using a table of maximal gaps, Firoozbakht verified her conjecture up to 4.444×10^{12}. Now with more extensive tables of maximal gaps, the conjecture has been verified for all primes below 2^{64} ≈ 1.84 × 10^{19}.

If the conjecture were true, then the prime gap function $g_n = p_{n+1} - p_n$ would satisfy

$$g_n < (\log p_n)^2 - \log p_n$$

for all $n\geqslant5$, and

$$g_n < (\log p_n)^2 - \log p_n - 1$$

for all $n\geqslant10$. See also OEIS: A111943. This is among the strongest upper bounds conjectured for prime gaps, even somewhat stronger than the Cramér and Shanks conjectures. It implies a strong form of Cramér's conjecture and is hence inconsistent with the heuristics of Granville and Pintz and of Maier, which suggest that

$$g_n > \frac{2-\varepsilon}{e^\gamma}(\log p_n)^2 \approx 1.1229(\log p_n)^2$$

occurs infinitely often for any $\varepsilon>0,$ where $\gamma$ denotes the Euler–Mascheroni constant.

Three related conjectures (see the comments of OEIS: A182514) are variants of Firoozbakht's. Forgues notes that Firoozbakht's can be written

$$\left(\frac{\log p_{n+1}}{\log p_n}\right)^n < \left(1 + \frac 1n\right)^n,$$

where the right-hand side is the well-known expression which reaches Euler's number in the limit $n\to\infty$, suggesting the slightly weaker conjecture

$$\left(\frac{\log p_{n+1}}{\log p_n}\right)^n < e.$$

Nicholson and Farhadian give two stronger versions of Firoozbakht's conjecture, which can be summarized as:

$\underbrace{\left(\frac{p_{n+1}}{p_n}\right)^n}_A < \underbrace{\frac{p_n\log n}{\log p_n}}_B < \underbrace{n\log n}_C < \underbrace{p_n}_D \qquad \text{ for all } n \geqslant 6,$

where A < B is Farhadian's conjecture, B < C is Nicholson's, C < D is Rosser's theorem, and A < D is Firoozbakht's conjecture. All have been verified to 2^{64}.

Applying the techniques to the known 85th maximal prime gap shows that Nicholson's (and thus Firoozbakht's) conjecture is true up to that value (1.014×10^{20} or 1.274×2^{66}), and any violation would require a gap greater than 2070. Likewise, a violation of Farhadian's conjecture would require a gap greater than 2066.

== See also ==
- Prime number theorem
- Andrica's conjecture
- Legendre's conjecture
- Oppermann's conjecture
- Cramér's conjecture
- Prime-counting function § inequalities
