= Maier's theorem =

Theorem about prime numbers

In number theory, Maier's theorem is a theorem due to Helmut Maier about the numbers of primes in short intervals for which Cramér's probabilistic model of primes gives a wrong answer.

The theorem states that if $\pi$ is the prime-counting function and $\lambda > 1$, then

$$\frac{\pi(x+(\log x)^\lambda)-\pi(x)}{(\log x)^{\lambda-1}}$$

does not have a limit as $x$ tends to infinity; more precisely the limit superior is greater than 1, and the limit inferior is less than 1. The Cramér model of primes predicts incorrectly that it has limit 1 when $\lambda \geq 2$ (using the Borel–Cantelli lemma).

== Proofs ==
Maier proved his theorem using Buchstab's equivalent for the counting function of quasi-primes (set of numbers without prime factors lower to bound $z = x^{1/u}$, with $u$ fixed). He also used an equivalent of the number of primes in arithmetic progressions of sufficient length due to Gallagher.

János Pintz gave another proof, and also showed that most probabilistic models of primes incorrectly predict the mean square error

$$\int_2^Y\!\bigg(\sum_{2<p\le x} \log p -\!\sum_{2<n\le x}1\bigg)^2dx$$

of one version of the prime number theorem.

== See also ==
- Maier's matrix method
