= Maier's matrix method =

Technique in analytic number theory by Helmut Maier

Maier's matrix method is a technique in analytic number theory by Helmut Maier that is used to demonstrate the existence of intervals of natural numbers within which the prime numbers are distributed with a certain property. In particular, it has been used to prove Maier's theorem (Maier 1985) and also the existence of chains of large gaps between consecutive primes (Maier 1981). The method uses estimates for the distribution of prime numbers in arithmetic progressions to prove the existence of a large set of intervals where the number of primes in the set is well understood and hence that at least one of the intervals contains primes in the required distribution.

== The method ==
The method first selects a primorial and then constructs an interval in which the distribution of integers coprime to the primorial is well understood. By looking at copies of the interval translated by multiples of the primorial an array (or matrix) of integers is formed where the rows are the translated intervals and the columns are arithmetic progressions where the difference is the primorial. By Dirichlet's theorem on arithmetic progressions the columns will contain many primes if and only if the integer in the original interval was coprime to the primorial. Good estimates for the number of small primes in these progressions due to (Gallagher 1970) allows the estimation of the primes in the matrix which guarantees the existence of at least one row or interval with at least a certain number of primes.
