= Julia Stadlmann =

Austrian mathematician (born 1998)

- Born: Unzmarkt, Styria, Austria
- Education: University of Oxford, Stanford University
- Known for: Improved bound on gaps between consecutive primes
- Scientific career
- Fields: Analytic number theory, sieve theory
- Workplaces: University of Illinois Urbana-Champaign
- Doctoral advisor: James Maynard

Julia Stadlmann (born 2 July 1998) is an Austrian mathematician working in analytic number theory and sieve theory. In August 2026 she improved the best known unconditional bound on gaps between consecutive prime numbers from 246 to 240, the first advance on the problem in twelve years.

== Early life and education ==
Stadlmann was born in Unzmarkt in Upper Styria and attended the BG/BRG Judenburg secondary school, competing successfully in mathematical olympiads in 2015 and 2016. At the age of 16 she was invited to the University of Oxford for a summer teaching programme, and in 2016 she received a Dr. Hans Riegel prize for outstanding pre-university research. Her parents have no particular background in mathematics.

She went on to study at Oxford, where she completed her DPhil under the supervision of James Maynard, winner of the 2022 Fields Medal for work on gaps between primes. In 2023 Quanta Magazine named her one of three early-career researchers contributing new results on the distribution of primes.

== Career ==
After a postdoctoral year at Stanford University, Stadlmann became a J. L. Doob Research Assistant Professor at the University of Illinois Urbana-Champaign. Her stated research interests include the properties of primes, sums of two squares, Harman's sieve and the GPY method, and large values of Dirichlet polynomials and exponential sums.

== Research ==
=== Primes in arithmetic progressions ===
In 2023 Stadlmann proved that the primes below $x$ are on average equidistributed in arithmetic progressions to smooth moduli of size up to $x^{1/2+1/40-\epsilon}$, raising the exponent of distribution from $\tfrac{1}{2}+\tfrac{7}{300}$, obtained earlier by the Polymath collaboration, to $\tfrac{1}{2}+\tfrac{1}{40}$. The main new ingredient was a modification of the q-van der Corput process.

=== Bounded gaps between primes ===
Building on her doctoral work on gaps between three or more primes, Stadlmann spent two years on the case of consecutive primes. In the 34-page preprint Bounded gaps between primes, posted to arXiv on 31 August 2026, she showed how the Bombieri–Vinogradov theorem can be combined with newer equidistribution estimates for smooth moduli to obtain $H_1 = \liminf (p_{n+1}-p_n) \leq 240$. This improved on the bound of 246 established in 2014 by Maynard and the Polymath8b project, which had itself followed Yitang Zhang's 2013 proof that the smallest infinitely recurring gap is at most 70 million.

Stadlmann had obtained a first proof some months earlier but continued working towards a sharper result; on hearing a rumour that OpenAI was about to publish on the same problem, she uploaded the version she had, saying she could not compete with such a company's computing power. The preprint has not yet undergone formal peer review.

==== Reception and concurrent AI results ====
Terence Tao called the paper "a remarkable effort in the spirit of the original Polymath8b argument", noting that it was carried out by a single mathematician using conventional numerical computation rather than modern AI tools. Stadlmann confirmed that she "did not use any AI at all", neither for the mathematical ideas nor for the code or the write-up. Maynard told Der Standard that computational methods were among her particular strengths and were important to the result.

== Selected publications ==
- Stadlmann, Julia (2023). "On primes in arithmetic progressions and bounded gaps between many primes". arXiv:2309.00425 [math.NT].
- Stadlmann, Julia (2026). "Bounded gaps between primes". arXiv:2608.31126 [math.NT].
