= Unzmarkt-Frauenburg =

- Municipality
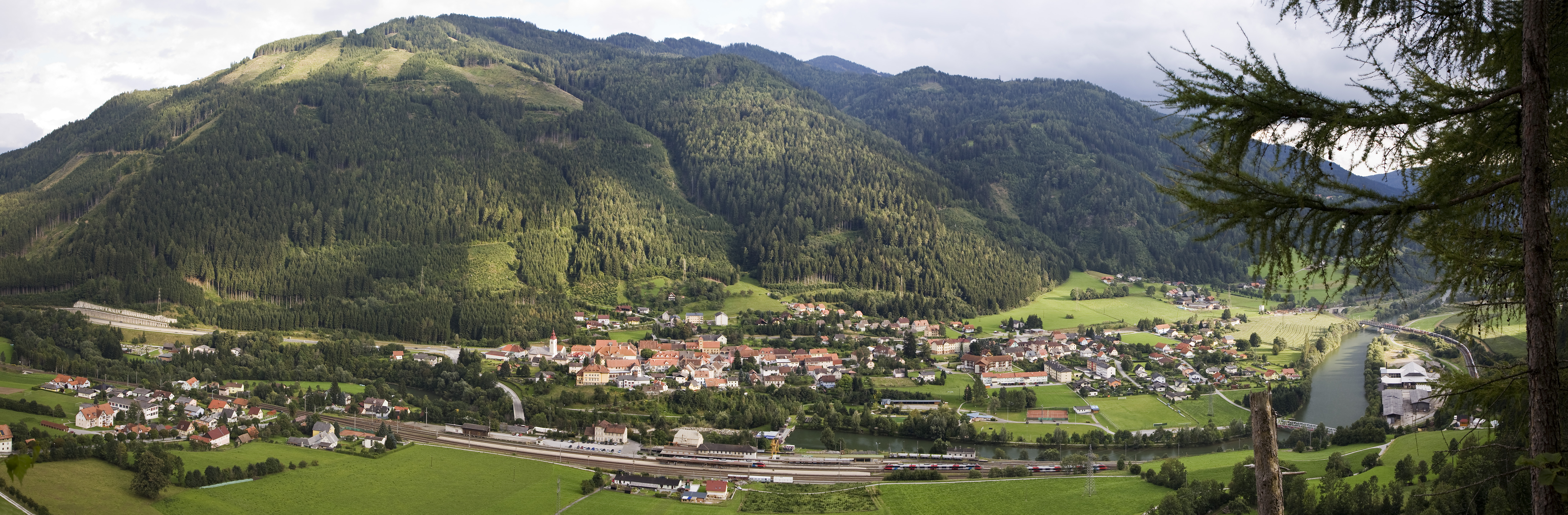
- View of Unzmarkt from the Frauenburg ruins

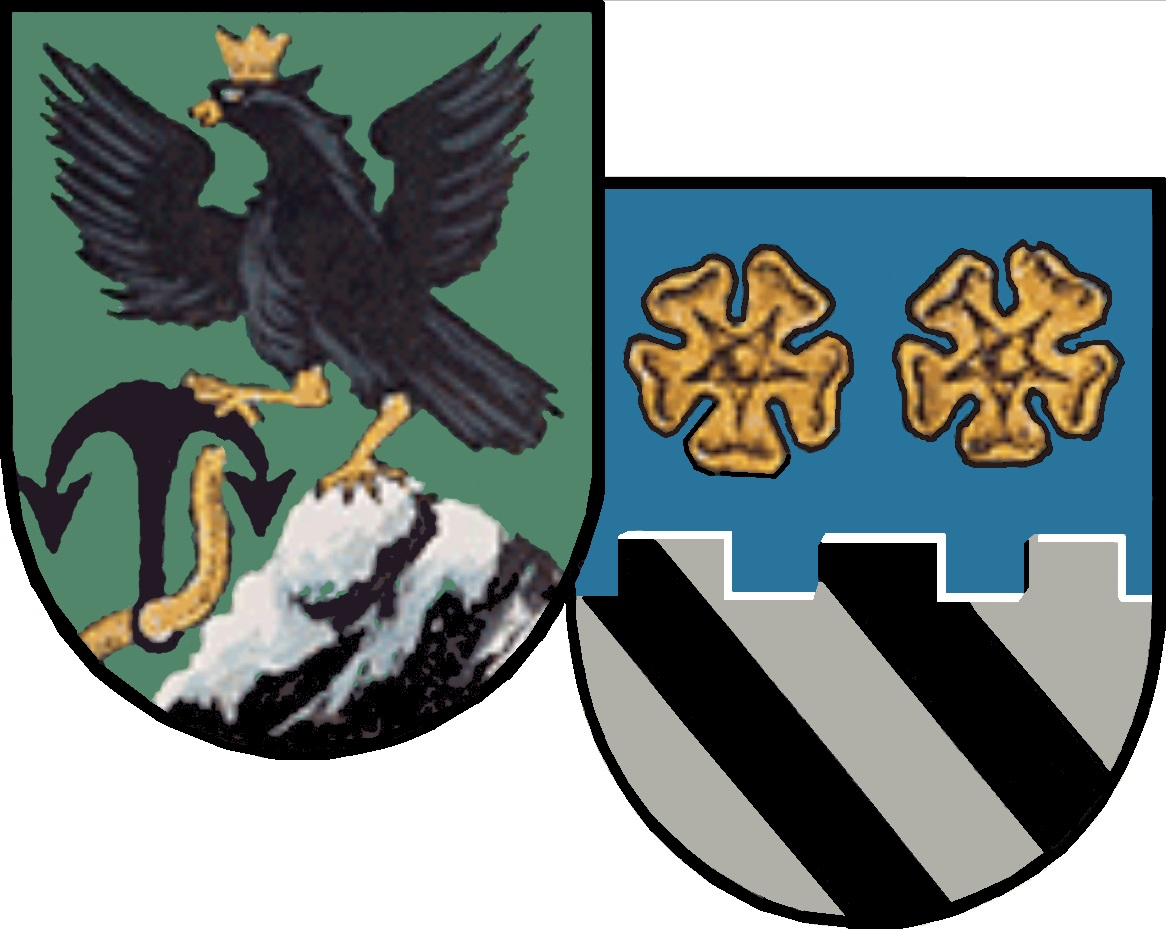
- Coat of arms

- Location within Austria
- Coordinates: 47°12′01″N 14°26′44″E
- Country: Austria
- State: Styria
- District: Murtal

Government
  - Mayor: Eberhard Wallner (ÖVP)

Area
  - Total: 36.57 km^{2} (14.12 sq mi)
- Elevation: 745 m (2,444 ft)

Population (2018-01-01)
  - Total: 1,346
  - Density: 36.81/km^{2} (95.33/sq mi)
- Time zone: UTC+1 (CET)
  - Summer (DST): UTC+2 (CEST)
- Postal code: 8800
- Area code: 03583
- Vehicle registration: JU
- Website: www.unzmarkt-frauenburg.at

Unzmarkt-Frauenburg is a municipality in the district of Murtal in Styria, Austria.

== Notable people ==
- Klaus Bachler (born 1991), racing driver
- Julia Stadlmann (born 1998), mathematician
