= Eduardo Casas-Alvero =

Spanish mathematician (born 1948)

Eduardo Casas-Alvero (born 1948) is a Spanish mathematician and a professor at the University of Barcelona. His work lies in algebraic geometry and commutative algebra, especially curve theory.

== Career ==
Casas-Alvero received his PhD at the University of Barcelona under the direction of Josep Teixidor i Batlle in 1975.

Casas-Alvero introduced the Casas-Alvero conjecture characterizing certain polynomials whose factors match their derivatives as powers of a linear polynomial.

== Bibliography ==
- Casas-Alvero, E. and Xambo-Descamps, S. (1986). The Enumerative Theory of Conics After Halphen. Lecture Notes in Mathematics. Springer.
- Casas-Alvero, E. (2000). Singularities of Plane Curves. London Mathematical Society Lecture Note Series. Cambridge University Press.
- Casas-Alvero, E. (2014). Analytic Projective Geometry. EMS Textbooks in Mathematics. European Mathematical Society.
- Casas-Alvero, E. (2019). Algebraic Curves, the Brill and Noether Way. Universitext. Springer.
