= Oppermann's conjecture =

Existence of a prime number between each square and pronic number

Unsolved problem in mathematics
Is every pair of a square number and a pronic number (both greater than one) separated by at least one prime?
More unsolved problems in mathematics

Oppermann's conjecture is an unsolved problem in mathematics on the distribution of prime numbers. It is closely related to but stronger than Legendre's conjecture, Andrica's conjecture, and Brocard's conjecture. It is named after Danish mathematician Ludvig Oppermann, who announced it in an unpublished lecture in March 1877.

== Statement ==
The conjecture states that, for every integer $n>1$, there is at least one prime number between

$n(n-1)$ and $n^2$,

and at least another prime between

$n^2$ and $n(n+1)$.

It can also be phrased equivalently as stating that the prime-counting function must take unequal values at the endpoints of each range. That is:

$\pi(n^2-n)<\pi(n^2)<\pi(n^2+n)$ for every $n>1$

with $\pi(x)$ being the number of prime numbers less than or equal to $x$. The end points of these two ranges are a square between two pronic numbers, with each of the pronic numbers being twice a pair triangular number. The sum of the pair of triangular numbers is the square.

== Consequences ==
If the conjecture is true, then the prime gap would be on the order of

$$g_n < \sqrt{p_n}.\,$$

This also means there would be at least two primes between $n^2$ and $(n+1)^2$ (one in the range from $n^2$ to $n(n+1)$ and the second in the range from $n(n+1)$ to $(n+1)^2$, strengthening Legendre's conjecture that there is at least one prime in this range. Because there is at least one non-prime between any two odd primes it would also imply Brocard's conjecture that there are at least four primes between the squares of consecutive odd primes. Additionally, it would imply that the largest possible gaps between two consecutive prime numbers could be at most proportional to twice the square root of the numbers, as Andrica's conjecture states.

The conjecture also implies that at least one prime can be found in every quarter revolution of the Ulam spiral.

== See also ==
- Bertrand's postulate
- Firoozbakht's conjecture
- Prime number theorem
