= Riemann–von Mangoldt formula =

Formula in analytic number theory

In mathematics, the Riemann–von Mangoldt formula, named for Bernhard Riemann and Hans Carl Friedrich von Mangoldt, describes the distribution of the zeros of the Riemann zeta function.

The formula states that the number N(T) of zeros of the zeta function with imaginary part greater than 0 and less than or equal to T satisfies

$$N(T)=\frac{T}{2\pi}\log{\frac{T}{2\pi}}-\frac{T}{2\pi}+O(\log{T}).$$

The formula was stated by Riemann in his notable paper "On the Number of Primes Less Than a Given Magnitude" (1859) and was finally proved by Mangoldt in 1905.

Backlund gives an explicit form of the error for all T > 2:

$$\left\vert{ N(T) - \left({\frac{T}{2\pi}\log{\frac{T}{2\pi}}-\frac{T}{2\pi} } - \frac{7}{8}\right)}\right\vert < 0.137 \log T + 0.443  \log\log T + 4.350 .$$

This result has since been improved upon, including by E. Hasanalizade, Q. Shen, and P-J. Wong:

$$\left|N(T)-\left(\frac T{2\pi}\log\frac T{2\pi}-\frac T{2\pi}\right)\right|\leq0.1038\log T+0.2573\log\log T+9.3675$$

for T ≥ e.

Under the Lindelöf and Riemann hypotheses, the error terms can be improved to $o(\log{T})$ and $O(\log{T}/\log{\log{T}})$ respectively.

A more precise formula is given by Anatolii A. Karatsuba and M. A. Korolev.

Similarly, for any primitive Dirichlet character χ modulo q, we have

$$N(T,\chi)=\frac{T}{\pi}\log{\frac{qT}{2\pi e}}+O(\log{qT}),$$

where N(T,χ) denotes the number of zeros of L(s,χ) with imaginary part between -T and T.
