= Doomsday conjecture =

In algebraic topology, the doomsday conjecture was a conjecture about Ext groups over the Steenrod algebra made by Joel Cohen, named by Michael Barratt, published by Milgram (1971, conjecture 73) and disproved by Mahowald (1977). Minami (1995) stated a modified version called the new doomsday conjecture.

The original doomsday conjecture was that for any prime p and positive integer s there are only a finite number of permanent cycles in

$$\text{Ext}_{A_*}^{s,*}(Z/pZ,Z/pZ). \,$$

Mahowald (1977) found an infinite number of permanent cycles for p = s = 2, disproving the conjecture. Minami's new doomsday conjecture is a weaker form stating (in the case p = 2) that there are no nontrivial permanent cycles in the image of (Sq^{0})^{n} for n sufficiently large depending on s.
