= Prime gap =

Difference between two successive prime numbers

A prime gap is the difference between two successive prime numbers. The $n$-th prime gap, denoted $g_n$ or $g(p_n)$ is the difference between the $(n+1)$th and the $n$-th prime numbers, i.e.,

$$g_n = p_{n+1} - p_n$$

For example, since the first few primes are 2, 3, 5, 7, 11..., we have $g_1 = 1$, $g_2 = g_3 = 2$, $g_4 = 4$. The sequence $g_n$ of prime gaps has been extensively studied; however, many questions and conjectures remain unanswered.

The first 60 prime gaps are:

1, 2, 2, 4, 2, 4, 2, 4, 6, 2, 6, 4, 2, 4, 6, 6, 2, 6, 4, 2, 6, 4, 6, 8, 4, 2, 4, 2, 4, 14, 4, 6, 2, 10, 2, 6, 6, 4, 6, 6, 2, 10, 2, 4, 2, 12, 12, 4, 2, 4, 6, 2, 10, 6, 6, 6, 2, 6, 4, 2, ... (sequence A001223 in the OEIS).

By the definition of $g_n$ every prime can be written as

$$p_{n+1} = 2 + \sum_{i=1}^n g_i.$$

== Simple observations ==
The first, smallest, and only odd prime gap is the gap of size 1 between 2, the only even prime number, and 3, the first odd prime. All other prime gaps are even. There is only one pair of consecutive gaps having length 2: the gaps $g_2$ and $g_3$ between the primes 3, 5, and 7.

For any integer $n$, the factorial $n!$ is the product of all positive integers up to and including $n$. Then in the sequence

$$n!+2,\; n!+3,\; \ldots,\; n!+n,$$

the first term is divisible by 2, the second term is divisible by 3, and so on. Thus, this is a sequence of n − 1 consecutive composite integers, and it must belong to a gap between primes having length at least $n$. It follows that there are gaps between primes that are arbitrarily large, that is, for any integer $N$, there is an integer $m$ with $g_m \geq N$.

However, prime gaps of $n$ numbers can occur at numbers much smaller than $n!$. For instance, the first prime gap of size larger than 14 occurs between the primes 523 and 541, while 15! is the vastly larger number 1 307 674 368 000.

The average gap between primes increases as the natural logarithm of these primes, and therefore the ratio of the prime gap to the primes involved decreases (and is asymptotically zero). This is a consequence of the prime number theorem. From a heuristic view, we expect the probability that the ratio of the length of the gap to the natural logarithm is greater than or equal to a fixed positive number $k$ to be $e^{-k}$; consequently the ratio can be arbitrarily large. Indeed, the ratio of the gap to the number of digits of the integers involved does increase without bound. This is a consequence of a result by Westzynthius.

In the opposite direction, the twin prime conjecture posits that $g_n=2$ for infinitely many integers $n$.

== Numerical results ==
Usually the ratio $g_n / (\ln p_n)$ is called the merit of the gap $g_n$. Informally, the merit of a gap $g_n$ can be thought of as the ratio of the size of the gap compared to the average prime gap sizes in the vicinity of $p_n$.

The largest known prime gap with identified probable prime gap ends has length 16045848, with 385713-digit probable primes and merit M = 18.067, found by Andreas Höglund in March 2024. The largest known prime gap with identified proven primes as gap ends has length 1113106 and merit 25.90, with 18662-digit primes found by P. Cami, M. Jansen and J. K. Andersen.

As of September 2026, the largest known merit value is 42.5192, found by Mario Vojvoda with the 611-digit prime 17440361647223 × 1439# / 2310 − 21464 and the gap of 59724. The first gap with merit over 40, discovered by the Gapcoin network in 2017, has merit 41.93878373 with the 87-digit prime 293703234068022590158723766104419463425709075574811762098588798217895728858676728143227.

Largest known merit values (as of September 2026)
Merit	g_{n}	digits	p_{n}	Date	Discoverer
42.5192	59724	611	17440361647223 × 1439# / 2310 − 21464	2026	Mario Vojvoda
41.9388	8350	87	2937032340680225901587237661044194634257090- 75574811762098588798217895728858676728143227	2017	Gapcoin
41.5882	58416	611	17325055497313 × 1439# / 2310 − 29514	2026	Mario Vojvoda
41.4853	58272	611	17546437666213 × 1439# / 2310 − 18058	2026	Mario Vojvoda
40.5729	57006	611	25769303913071 × 1439# / 2310 − JL1	2026	Mario Vojvoda
40.5563	56982	611	25394073504871 × 1439# / 2310 − 26730	2026	Mario Vojvoda
40.2468	1854	21	101412319996363309069	2026	Robert Smith
40.0310	13326	145	363988776293 × 337# / 210 − 4854	2026	Seth Troisi
39.8898	56046	611	25684834227557 × 1439# / 2310 − JL2	2026	Mario Vojvoda
39.6202	15900	175	3483347771 × 409# / 30 − 7016	2017	Dana Jacobsen

The Cramér–Shanks–Granville ratio is the ratio $g_n / (\ln p_n)^2$. If we discard anomalously high values of the ratio for the primes 2, 3, and 7, then the greatest known value of this ratio is 0.9206386 for the prime 1693182318746371. For comparison, the gap discovered by the Gapcoin network (with merit 41.9) has a Cramér–Shanks–Granville ratio of just 0.2058791. Other record terms can be found at OEIS: A111943.

We say that $g_n$ is a maximal gap, if $g_m < g_n$ for all $m < n$. As of May 2026, the largest known maximal prime gap has length 1854, found by Robert Smith, using code by Brian Kehrig. It is the 85th maximal prime gap, and it occurs after the prime 101412319996363309069. Other record (maximal) gap sizes can be found in OEIS: A005250, with the corresponding primes $p_n$ in OEIS: A002386, and the values of $n$ in OEIS: A005669. The sequence of maximal gaps up to the $n$-th prime is conjectured to have about $2 \ln n$ terms.

The 85 known maximal prime gaps

Gaps 1 to 43
#	g_{n}	p_{n}	n
1	1	2	1
2	2	3	2
3	4	7	4
4	6	23	9
5	8	89	24
6	14	113	30
7	18	523	99
8	20	887	154
9	22	1129	189
10	34	1327	217
11	36	9551	1183
12	44	15683	1831
13	52	19609	2225
14	72	31397	3385
15	86	155921	14357
16	96	360653	30802
17	112	370261	31545
18	114	492113	40933
19	118	1349533	103520
20	132	1357201	104071
21	148	2010733	149689
22	154	4652353	325852
23	180	17051707	1094421
24	210	20831323	1319945
25	220	47326693	2850174
26	222	122164747	6957876
27	234	189695659	10539432
28	248	191912783	10655462
29	250	387096133	20684332
30	282	436273009	23163298
31	288	1294268491	64955634
32	292	1453168141	72507380
33	320	2300942549	112228683
34	336	3842610773	182837804
35	354	4302407359	203615628
36	382	10726904659	486570087
37	384	20678048297	910774004
38	394	22367084959	981765347
39	456	25056082087	1094330259
40	464	42652618343	1820471368
41	468	127976334671	5217031687
42	474	182226896239	7322882472
43	486	241160624143	9583057667

Gaps 44 to 85
#	g_{n}	p_{n}	n
44	490	297501075799	11723859927
45	500	303371455241	11945986786
46	514	304599508537	11992433550
47	516	416608695821	16202238656
48	532	461690510011	17883926781
49	534	614487453523	23541455083
50	540	738832927927	28106444830
51	582	1346294310749	50070452577
52	588	1408695493609	52302956123
53	602	1968188556461	72178455400
54	652	2614941710599	94906079600
55	674	7177162611713	251265078335
56	716	13829048559701	473258870471
57	766	19581334192423	662221289043
58	778	42842283925351	1411461642343
59	804	90874329411493	2921439731020
60	806	171231342420521	5394763455325
61	906	218209405436543	6822667965940
62	916	1189459969825483	35315870460455
63	924	1686994940955803	49573167413483
64	1132	1693182318746371	49749629143526
65	1184	43841547845541059	1175661926421598
66	1198	55350776431903243	1475067052906945
67	1220	80873624627234849	2133658100875638
68	1224	203986478517455989	5253374014230870
69	1248	218034721194214273	5605544222945291
70	1272	305405826521087869	7784313111002702
71	1328	352521223451364323	8952449214971382
72	1356	401429925999153707	10160960128667332
73	1370	418032645936712127	10570355884548334
74	1442	804212830686677669	20004097201301079
75	1476	1425172824437699411	34952141021660495
76	1488	5733241593241196731	135962332505694894
77	1510	6787988999657777797	160332893561542066
78	1526	15570628755536096243	360701908268316580
79	1530	17678654157568189057	408333670434942092
80	1550	18361375334787046697	423731791997205041
81	1552	18470057946260698231	426181820436140029
82	1572	18571673432051830099	428472240920394477
83	1676	20733746510561442863	477141032543986017
84	1724	68068810283234182907	1524717378371224128
85	1854	101412319996363309069	2251483061895611799

== Further results ==
=== Upper bounds ===
Bertrand's postulate, proven in 1852, states that there is always a prime number between $k$ and $2k$ (for all k ≥ 2), so in particular $p_{n+1} < 2 p_n$, which means $g_n < p_n$.

The prime number theorem, proven in 1896, says that the average length of the gap between a prime $p$ and the next prime will asymptotically approach $\ln p$, the natural logarithm of $p$, for sufficiently large primes. The actual length of the gap might be much more or less than this. However, one can deduce from the prime number theorem that the gaps get arbitrarily smaller in proportion to the primes: the quotient

$$\lim_{n\to\infty}\frac{g_n}{p_n}=0.$$

In other words (by definition of a limit), for every $\varepsilon > 0$, there is a number $N$ such that for all $n > N$,

$$g_n < p_n\varepsilon$$

Hoheisel (1930) was the first to show a sublinear dependence; that there exists a constant $\theta < 1$ such that

$$\pi(x + x^\theta) - \pi(x) \sim \frac{x^\theta}{\log x} \text{ as } x \to \infty,$$

hence showing that for sufficiently large $n$,

$$g_n < {p_n}^\theta$$

Hoheisel obtained the possible value 32999/33000 for $\theta$. This was improved to 249/250 by Heilbronn, and to $\theta = 3/4 + \varepsilon$, for any $\varepsilon > 0$, by Chudakov.

A major improvement is due to Ingham, who showed that for some positive constant c,

if $\zeta(1/2 + it) = O(t^c)$ then $\pi(x + x^\theta) - \pi(x) \sim \frac{x^\theta}{\log x}$ for any $\theta > (1 + 4c)/(2 + 4c).$

Here, O refers to the big O notation, ζ denotes the Riemann zeta function and π the prime-counting function. Knowing that any c > 1/6 is admissible, one obtains that θ may be any number greater than 5/8.

Since 5/8+ε < 2/3, and the gap between consecutive cubes is of the order of $n^{2/3}$, it follows that there is always a prime number between n^{3} and (n + 1)^{3}, if n is sufficiently large. In 2016, Dudek gave an explicit version of Ingham's result: there are primes between consecutive cubes for all $n > e^{e^{33.217}}\approx1.01\cdot10^{115809466034000}$.

The Lindelöf hypothesis would imply that Ingham's formula holds for c any positive number, but this would not be enough to imply Legendre's conjecture that there is a prime number between n^{2} and (n + 1)^{2}, even if limited to sufficiently large n . To verify this, a stronger result such as Cramér's conjecture would be needed.

Huxley in 1972 showed that one may choose θ = 7/12 = 0.583̅.

A result, due to Baker, Harman and Pintz in 2001, shows that θ may be taken to be 0.525.

The above describes limits on all gaps; another area of interest is the minimum gap size. The twin prime conjecture asserts that there are always more gaps of size 2, but remains unproven. In 2005, Daniel Goldston, János Pintz and Cem Yıldırım proved that

$$\liminf_{n\to\infty}\frac{g_n}{\log p_n} = 0$$

and 2 years later improved this to

$$\liminf_{n\to\infty}\frac{g_n}{\sqrt{\log p_n}(\log\log p_n)^2}<\infty.$$

In 2013, Yitang Zhang proved that

$$\liminf_{n\to\infty} g_n < 7\cdot 10^7,$$

meaning that there are infinitely many gaps that do not exceed 70 million. A Polymath Project collaborative effort to optimize Zhang's bound managed to lower the bound to 4680 on July 20, 2013. In November 2013, James Maynard introduced a new refinement of the GPY sieve, allowing him to reduce the bound to 600 and also show that the gaps between primes m apart are bounded for all m. That is, for any m there exists a bound Δ_{m} such that p_{n+m} − p_{n} ≤ Δ_{m} for infinitely many n. Using Maynard's ideas, the Polymath project improved the bound to 246.

On August 28, 2026, an argument discovered by GPT-5.6 Sol and presented by Hanxin Zhang claimed an improvement on the Polymath8b bound from 246 to 240. 3 days later Julia Stadlmann submitted a preprint developing new techniques and also claiming to reduce the bound to 240. In work dating 1 September, 2026 Shiva Kintali with unspecified AI agents claimed an improvement of the bound to 236. On September 3 Axiom Math with AxiomProver claimed an improvement of the bound to 212 and a few hours before (on September 2 in USA) OpenAI using GPT-6 Astra produced a further claim to the bound to 186.

As of September 2026, none of those claims has been peer-reviewed, leaving the established bound at 246.

Assuming the Elliott–Halberstam conjecture and its generalized form, the bound has been reduced to 12 and 6, respectively.

=== Lower bounds ===
In 1931, Erik Westzynthius proved that maximal prime gaps grow more than logarithmically. That is,

$$\limsup_{n\to\infty}\frac{g_n}{\log p_n}=\infty.$$

In 1938, Robert Rankin proved the existence of a constant c > 0 such that the inequality

$$g_n > \frac{c\ \log n\ \log\log n\ \log\log\log\log n}{(\log\log\log n)^2}$$

holds for infinitely many values of n, improving the results of Westzynthius and Paul Erdős. He later showed that one can take any constant c < e^{γ}, where γ is the Euler–Mascheroni constant. The value of the constant c was improved in 1997 to any value less than 2e^{γ}.

Paul Erdős offered a $10,000 prize for a proof or disproof that the constant c in the above inequality may be taken arbitrarily large. This was proved to be correct in 2014 by Ford–Green–Konyagin–Tao and, independently, James Maynard (the two works were submitted to arXiv within one day of each other).

The result was further improved to

$$g_n > \frac{c\ \log n\ \log\log n\ \log\log\log\log n}{\log\log\log n}$$

for infinitely many values of n by Ford–Green–Konyagin–Maynard–Tao.

In the spirit of Erdős' original prize, Terence Tao offered US$10,000 for a proof that c may be taken arbitrarily large in this inequality.

In 2026, a proof and formalization in Lean claiming authorship by AI model GPT-5.6 Sol was uploaded to Github, positing an improvement on the bound to

$$g_n > \frac{c\ \log n\ \log\log n}{\log\log\log\log n}.$$

Later that year, OpenAI released a proof and formalization in Lean improving the bound to

$$g_n > \frac{c\ \log n\ (\log\log n)^2\ \log\log\log\log n}{(\log\log\log n)^2}.$$

Neither claimed proof has yet been fully verified.

Lower bounds for chains of primes have also been determined.

== Conjectures about gaps between primes ==
As described above, the best proven bound on gap sizes is g_{n} < p_{n}^{0.525} (for n sufficiently large; we do not worry about 5 − 3 > 3^{0.525} or 29 − 23 > 23^{0.525}), but it is observed that even maximal gaps are significantly smaller than that, leading to a plethora of unproven conjectures.

The first group hypothesize that the exponent can be reduced to θ = 0.5.

Both Legendre's conjecture that there always exists a prime between consecutive perfect squares and Andrica's conjecture that the difference of square roots of consecutive primes is bounded by 1 imply that

$$g_n < 2\sqrt{p_n}.$$

Oppermann's conjecture makes the stronger claim that, for sufficiently large n (probably n ≥ 31),

$$g_n < \sqrt{p_n}.$$

All of these remain unproved. Harald Cramér came close, proving that the Riemann hypothesis implies the gap g_{n} satisfies

$$g_n = O(\sqrt{p_n} \log p_n),$$

using the big O notation. (In fact this result needs only the weaker Lindelöf hypothesis, if one can tolerate an exponent infinitesimally larger than 1/2.)

Dudek also proved an explicit version of Cramer's result (also assuming Riemann hypothesis) that is, for all n ≥ 2,

$g_n < \frac{4}{\pi}\sqrt{p_n}\log p_n$

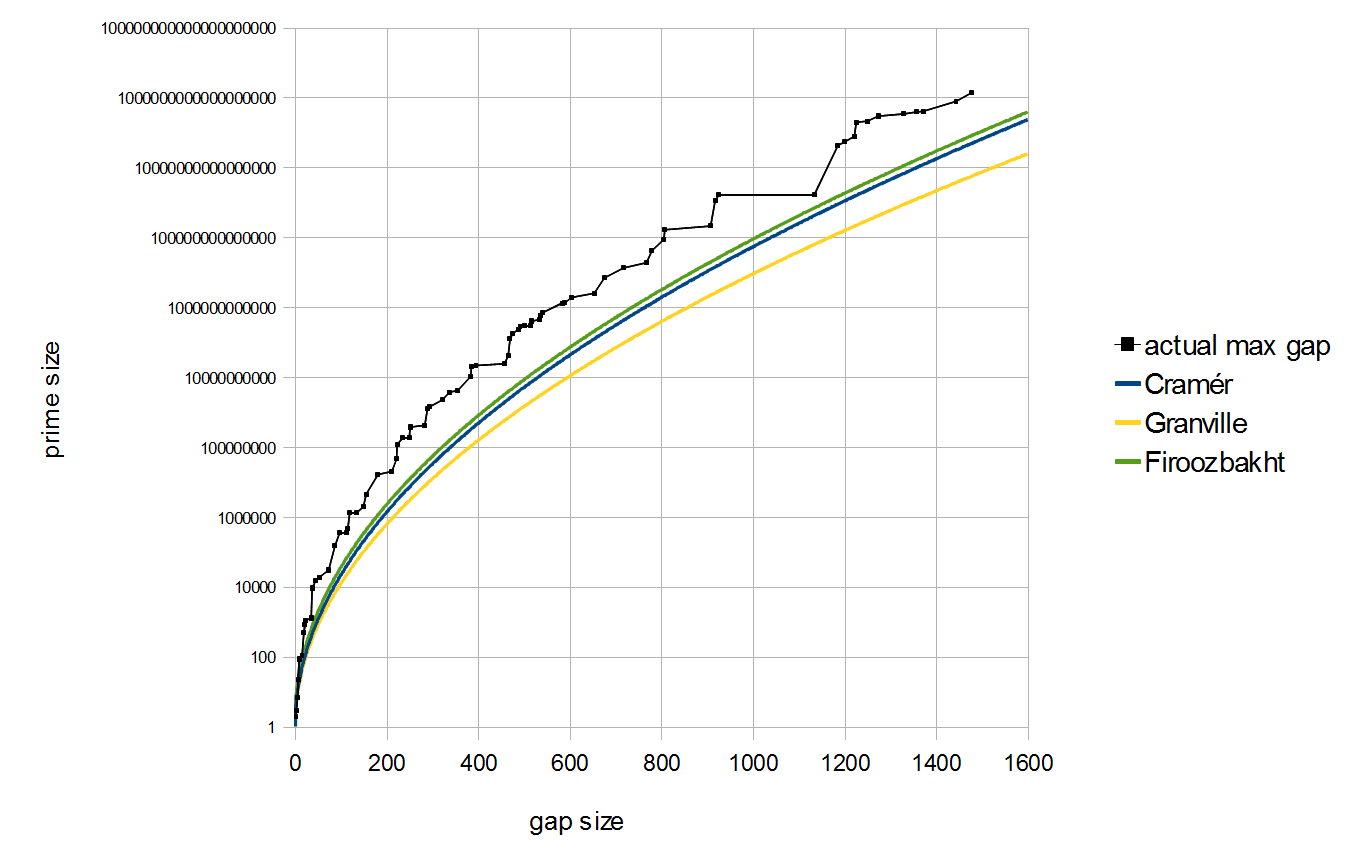
Prime gap function

As noted by Dudek, for sufficiently large n one may reduce the constant $4/\pi$ to be any constant greater than 1.

In the same article, Cramér conjectured that the gaps are far smaller. Roughly speaking, Cramér's conjecture states that

$$g_n = O\!\left((\log p_n)^2\right)\!,$$

a polylogarithmic growth rate slower than any exponent θ > 0.

Cramér's model, under which he made the conjecture, was oversimplified (assuming some events are statistically independent when they are dependent) and thus not very accurate (see Cramér's conjecture), but after further investigations, new heuristics were found which became strong evidence that the conjecture is true.

As this matches the observed growth rate of prime gaps, there are a number of similar conjectures. Firoozbakht's conjecture is slightly stronger, stating that p_{n}^{1/n} is a strictly decreasing function of n, i.e., for all n ≥ 1,

$$(p_{n+1})^{1/(n+1)} < (p_n)^{1/n}$$

If this conjecture is true, then g_{n} < (log p_{n})^{2} − log p_{n} − 1 for all n ≥ 10. It implies a strong form of Cramér's conjecture but is inconsistent with the heuristics of Granville and Pintz, which suggest that g_{n} > (2 − ϵ)e^{−γ}(log p_{n})^{2} > (1.1229 − ϵ)(log p_{n})^{2} infinitely often for any ϵ > 0, where γ denotes the Euler–Mascheroni constant.

Polignac's conjecture states that every positive even number k occurs as a prime gap infinitely often. The case k = 2 is the twin prime conjecture.

== As an arithmetic function ==
The gap g_{n} between the nth and (n + 1)th prime numbers is an example of an arithmetic function. In this context it is usually denoted d_{n} and called the prime difference function. The function is neither multiplicative nor additive.

== See also ==
- Bonse's inequality
- Gaussian moat
- Twin prime
