= Farideh Firoozbakht =

Iranian mathematician (1962–2019)

Farideh Firoozbakht (Persian: فریده فیروزبخت; 18 March 1962 – 24 December 2019) was an Iranian mathematician. She stated Firoozbakht's conjecture on the distribution of prime numbers in 1982. She studied pharmacology and later mathematics at the University of Isfahan and taught mathematics at Iranian universities including the University of Isfahan.
