= Ludvig Oppermann =

Danish mathematician and philologist

Ludvig Henrik Ferdinand Oppermann (September 7, 1817 – August 17, 1883) was a Danish mathematician and philologist who formulated Oppermann's conjecture on the distribution of prime numbers.

== Publications ==
From :

- 1857: Bidrag til Landmaalingens Theori. (Contributions to the theory of geodesy.) Tidsskr. Krigsvaxsen, 332–44.
- 1863: Under the signature "En Dilettant": En Foresp0rgsel. (A request.) Tidsskr. Math. (1) 5, p. 16.
  - Under the signature "En Dilettant": Minimumsproblemer. (Minimum problems.) Tidsskr. Math. (1) 5, 17–26.
- 1866: Om Livsforsikringer og Livrenter. (On life insurance and pensions.) Copenhagen, 24 pp.
- 1869: Notes on Newton's formulae for interpolation. The Assurance Mag. 15, 145-8 and 177–9.
- 1870: On Brigg's formula for interpolation. The Assurance Mag. 15, 312.
  - On the graduation of life tables, with special application to the rate of mortality in infancy and childhood. The Assurance Rec., Febr. 11.
- 1871: Om Kvadratur. (On quadrature.) Tidsskr. Math. (3) 1 11–27.
- 1872: Elementaere Darstellung, der numerischen Summation und Quadratur. Copenhagen, 21 pp.
  - Zur Begriindungder allgemeinenFehlertheorie(Methode der kleinsten Quadraten). Hamburg, 20 pp.

== Bibliography ==
- The Reticent Trio: Some Little-Known Early Discoveries in Life Insurance Mathematics by L.H.F. Oppermann, T.N. Thiele and J.P. Gram, Jan M. Hoem, International Statistical Review / Revue Internationale de Statistique, Vol. 51, No. 2 (Aug., 1983), pp. 213–221

From :

- Gram, J. P. (1883). Ludvig Henrik Ferdinand Oppermann. Tidsskr. Math. (5) 1, 137–44.
- Gram, J. P. (1884). Om udjevning av Dodelighedsiagttagelser og Oppermann's Dødelighedsformel. (On smoothing mortality curves and the mortality formula of Oppermann.) Tidsskr. Math. (5) 2, 113–39.
- Sebelien, J. (1883. En grafisk Fremstelling av Forsogsrakker. (A graphical representation of observations.)
- Tidsskr. Math. (5) 1, 186–90.
- Thiele, T. N. (1890). Et stykke arvegods fra professor Oppermann. Nyt Tidsskr. Mat. 1.
