= Hao Huang (mathematician) =

Chinese mathematician and computer scientist

Hao Huang (Chinese: 黄皓; pinyin: Huáng Hào) is a Chinese mathematician known for solving the sensitivity conjecture. Huang is currently an associate professor in the mathematics department at National University of Singapore.

Huang received a B.S. degree in mathematics at Peking University in 2007. He obtained his Ph.D. in mathematics from his dissertation titled Various Problems in Extremal Combinatorics from the University of California, Los Angeles (UCLA) in 2012 advised by Benny Sudakov. His postdoctoral research was done at the Institute for Advanced Study in Princeton, New Jersey and DIMACS at Rutgers University in 2012–2014, followed by a year at the Institute for Mathematics and its Applications at the University of Minnesota. Huang then became an assistant professor from 2015 to 2021 in the Department of Mathematics at Emory University.

In July 2019, Huang announced a breakthrough, which gave a proof of the sensitivity conjecture. At that point the conjecture had been open for nearly 30 years, having been posed by Noam Nisan and Mario Szegedy in 1992. Huang has received positive attention for his discovery, as theoretical computer scientist Scott Aaronson described, "I find it hard to imagine that even God knows how to prove the Sensitivity Conjecture in any simpler way than this."

Huang received an NSF Career Award in 2019 and a Sloan Research Fellowship in 2020.
