= Ibragimov–Iosifescu conjecture for φ-mixing sequences =

Collective name for 2 closely-related conjectures in probability theory

Ibragimov–Iosifescu conjecture for φ-mixing sequences in probability theory is the collective name for 2 closely related conjectures by Ildar Ibragimov and ro:Marius Iosifescu.

== Conjecture ==
Let $(X_n,n\in\Bbb N)$ be a strictly stationary $\phi$-mixing sequence, for which $\mathbb E(X_0^2)<\infty$ and $\operatorname{Var}(S_n)\to +\infty$. Then $S_n:=\sum_{j=1}^nX_j$ is asymptotically normally distributed.

$\phi$ -mixing coefficients are defined as $\phi_X(n):=\sup(|\mu(B\mid A)-\mu(B)|, A\in\mathcal F^m, B\in \mathcal F_{m+n},m\in\Bbb N )$, where $\mathcal F^m$ and $\mathcal F_{m+n}$ are the $\sigma$-algebras generated by the $X_j, j\leqslant m$ (respectively $j\geqslant m+n$), and $\phi$-mixing means that $\phi_X(n)\to 0$.

Reformulated:

Suppose $X:=(X_k, k \in {\mathbf Z})$ is a strictly stationary sequence of random variables such that $EX_0 = 0, \ EX_0^2 < \infty$ and $ES_n^2 \to \infty$ as $n \to \infty$ (that is, such that it has finite second moments and $\operatorname{Var}(X_1 + \ldots + X_n) \to \infty$ as $n \to \infty$).

Per Ibragimov, under these assumptions, if also $X$ is $\phi$-mixing, then a central limit theorem holds. Per a closely related conjecture by Iosifescu, under the same hypothesis, a weak invariance principle holds. Both conjectures together formulated in similar terms:

Let $\{X_n\}_n$ be a strictly stationary, centered, $\phi$-mixing sequence of random variables such that $EX^2_1 < \infty$ and $\sigma^2_n \to \infty$. Then per Ibragimov $S_n / \sigma_n \overset{W}{\to} N(0, 1)$, and per Iosifescu $S_{[n1]} / \sigma_n \overset{W}{\to} W$. Also, a related conjecture by Magda Peligrad states that under the same conditions and with $\phi_1 < 1$, $\overset{\sim}{W}_n \overset{W}{\to} W$.

== Relation to other mixing conditions ==
The conjecture occupies an important position in the theory of dependent stochastic processes because φ-mixing is one of the strongest classical mixing conditions. A large number of central limit theorems are known for stationary processes satisfying stronger assumptions on dependence, while the precise behaviour of φ-mixing sequences under only finite-variance assumptions remained less well understood.

A sequence is φ-mixing if future events become asymptotically independent of past events in a uniform sense. The φ-mixing condition is stronger than the more widely studied α-mixing (strong mixing) condition. Consequently, many probabilists expected that a central limit theorem should hold under relatively weak moment assumptions for φ-mixing sequences.

The conjecture is therefore closely connected with the broader question of determining which dependence assumptions are sufficient to guarantee asymptotic normality of partial sums.

== Status ==
In September 2026, a candidate counterexample to the conjecture was announced by Tom Adamczewski in a public GitHub repository. The counterexample was generated by GPT-6 Astra and formalised in the Lean (proof assistant). If correct, the construction disproves Ibragimov's central limit theorem conjecture and consequently disproves Iosifescu's stronger weak invariance principle conjecture. This result remains unaudited by the mathematical community and presents the construction as a candidate disproof pending independent verification.
