= Brennan conjecture =

In mathematics, specifically complex analysis, the Brennan conjecture, or Brennan’s Theorem, is a conjecture estimating (under specified conditions) the integral powers of the moduli of the derivatives of conformal maps into the open unit disk. The conjecture was formulated by James E. Brennan in 1978.

Let W be a simply connected open subset of $\mathbb{C}$ with at least two boundary points in the extended complex plane. Let $\varphi$ be a conformal map of W onto the open unit disk. The Brennan conjecture states that $\int_W |\varphi\ '|^p\, \mathrm{d}x\, \mathrm{d}y < \infty$ whenever $4/3 < p < 4$. Brennan proved the result when $4/3 < p < p_0$ for some constant $p_0 > 3$. Bertilsson proved in 1999 that the result holds when $4/3 < p < 3.422$, but the full result remains open. However, in September 2026, OpenAI authored a preprint claiming the conjecture as true; this result is unverified.
