= Casas-Alvero conjecture =

Unsolved problem in number theory

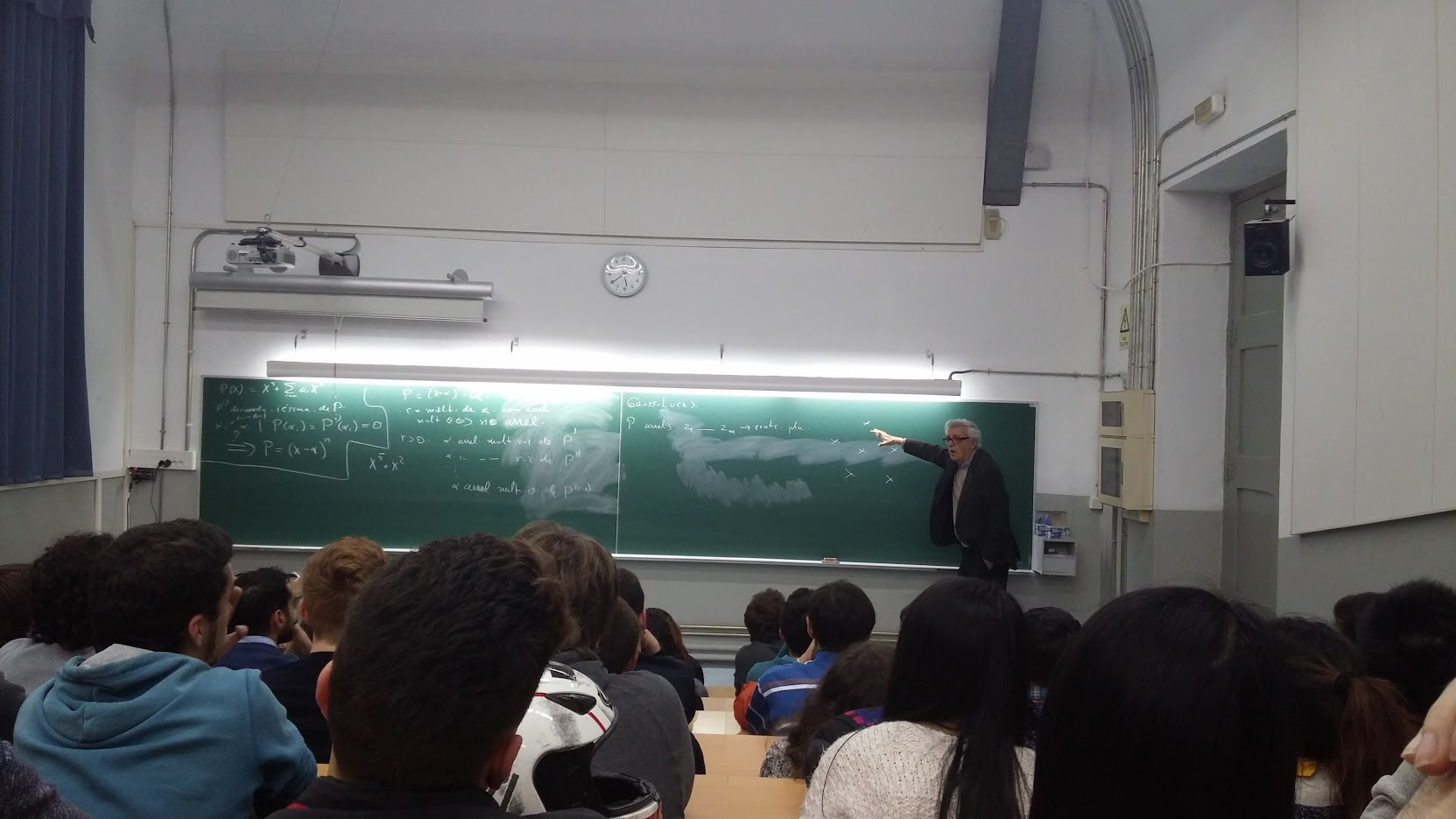
Casas-Alvero talking about the conjecture in a conference in the University of Barcelona on March 16, 2016.

In mathematics, the Casas-Alvero conjecture is a problem about polynomials which have factors in common with their derivatives, proposed by Eduardo Casas-Alvero in 2001.

== Formal statement ==
Let f be a polynomial of degree d defined over a field K of characteristic zero. If f has a factor in common with each of its derivatives f^{(i)}, i = 1, ..., d − 1, then the conjecture predicts that f must be a power of a linear polynomial.

== Analogue in non-zero characteristic ==
The conjecture is false over a field of positive characteristic p: any inseparable polynomial f(X^{p}) without constant term satisfies the condition since all derivatives are zero. Another counterexample (which is separable) is X^{p+1} − X^{p}.

== Special cases ==
The conjecture is known to hold in characteristic zero for degrees of the form p^{k} or 2p^{k} where p is prime and k is a positive integer. Similarly, it is known for degrees of the form 3p^{k} where p ≠ 2, for degrees of the form 4p^{k} where p ≠ 3, 5, 7, and for degrees of the form 5p^{k} where p ≠ 2, 3, 7, 11, 131, 193, 599, 3541, 8009. Similar results are available for degrees of the form 6p^{k} and 7p^{k}. It is later established for d = 12, making d = 20 the smallest open degree.
