= Martin Huxley =

British mathematician

Martin Neil Huxley
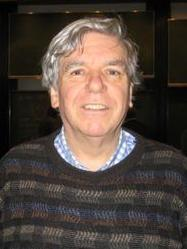
- Martin Huxley in 2008
- Born: 1944 (age 81–82); Worksop
- Education: University of Cambridge
- Known for: Analytic number theory Sieve theory
- Scientific career
- Fields: Mathematician
- Workplaces: University of Cardiff
- Doctoral advisor: Harold Davenport

Martin Neil Huxley FLSW (born in 1944) is a British mathematician, working in the field of analytic number theory.

He was awarded a PhD from the University of Cambridge in 1970, the year after his supervisor Harold Davenport had died. He is a professor at Cardiff University.

Huxley proved a result on gaps between prime numbers, namely that if p_{n} denotes the n-th prime number and if θ > 7/12, then

$$p_{n+1} - p_n < p_n^\theta,$$

for all sufficiently large n.

Huxley also improved the known bound on the Dirichlet divisor problem.

In 2011, Huxley was elected a Fellow of the Learned Society of Wales.
