= Bertrand's postulate =

Result on density of prime numbers

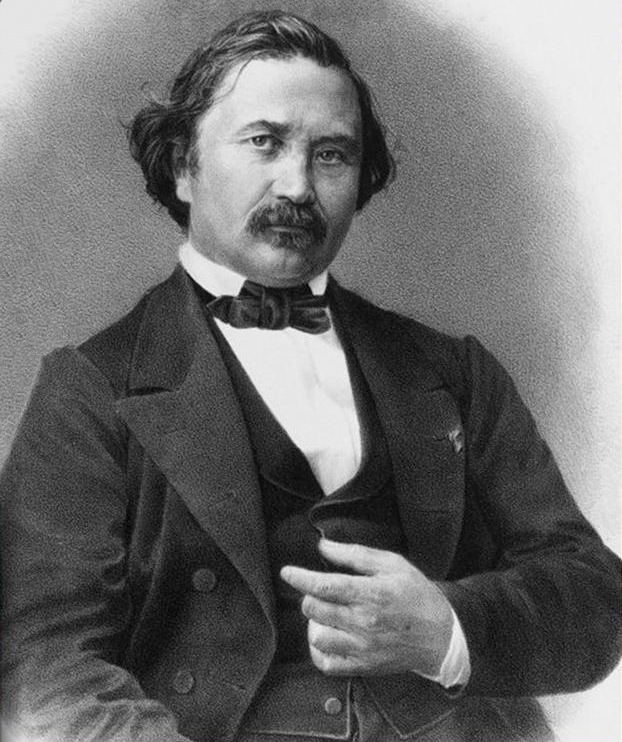
Joseph Louis François Bertrand

In number theory, Bertrand's postulate is the theorem that for any integer $n > 3$, there exists at least one prime number $p$ with

$$n < p < 2n - 2.$$

A less restrictive formulation is: for every $n > 1$, there is always at least one prime $p$ such that

$$n < p < 2n.$$

Another formulation, where $p_n$ is the $n$-th prime, is: for $n \ge 1$

$p_{n+1} < 2p_n.$

This hypothesis was first conjectured in 1845 by Joseph Bertrand, who verified it for all integers up to 3,000,000.

Chebyshev proved it in 1852 and so it is also called the Bertrand–Chebyshev theorem or Chebyshev's theorem. Chebyshev's theorem can also be stated as a relationship with $\pi(x)$, the prime-counting function (number of primes less than or equal to $x$):

$$\pi(x) - \pi\bigl(\tfrac{x}{2}\bigr) \ge 1, \text{ for all } x \ge 2.$$

== Prime number theorem ==
The prime number theorem (PNT) implies that the number of primes up to $x$, denoted $\pi(x)$, is roughly $x/\text{log}(x)$, so if we replace $x$ with $2x$ then we see the number of primes up to $2x$ is asymptotically twice the number of primes up to $x$ (the terms $\text{log}(2x)$ and $\text{log}(x)$ are asymptotically equivalent). Therefore, the number of primes between $n$ and $2n$ is roughly $n/\text{log}(n)$ when $n$ is large, and so in particular there are many more primes in this interval than are guaranteed by Bertrand's postulate. So Bertrand's postulate is weaker than the PNT; but it makes precise claims about what happens for small values of $n$.

The similar and still unsolved Legendre's conjecture asks whether for every $n \ge 1$, there is a prime $p$ such that $n^2 < p < (n+1)^2$. Again we expect that there will be not just one but many primes between $n^2$ and $(n+1)^2$, but in this case the PNT does not help: the number of primes up to $x^2$ is asymptotic to $x^2/\text{log}(x^2)$ while the number of primes up to $(x+1)^2$ is asymptotic to $(x+1)^2/\text{log}((x+1)^2)$, which is asymptotic to the estimate on primes up to $x^2$. So, unlike the previous case of $x$ and $2x$, we do not get a proof of Legendre's conjecture for large $n$. Error estimates on the PNT are not (indeed, cannot be) sufficient to prove the existence of even one prime in this interval. In greater detail, the PNT allows to estimate the boundaries for all $\varepsilon > 0$, there exists an $S$ such that for $x > S$:

$$(1-\varepsilon)\frac {x^2}{2\log x} \; < \; \pi(x^2) \; < \; (1+\varepsilon)\frac {x^2}{2\log x} \; ,$$
$$(1-\varepsilon)\frac {(x+1)^2}{2\log (x+1)} \; < \; \pi((x+1)^2) \; < \; (1+\varepsilon)\frac {(x+1)^2}{2\log (x+1)} \; .$$

The ratio between the lower bound $\pi((x+1)^2)$ and the upper bound of $\pi(x^2)$ is

$$\frac {(x+1)^2}{x^2}\cdot \frac {\log x}{\log (x+1)} \cdot \frac {1-\varepsilon}{1+\varepsilon} \; .$$

Note that since $\frac {(x+1)^2}{x^2} \rightarrow 1$ when $x \rightarrow \infty$, $\frac {\log x}{\log (x+1)} < 1$ for all x > 0, and $\frac {1-\varepsilon}{1+\varepsilon} < 1$ for a fixed $\varepsilon$, there exists an $R$ such that the ratio above is less than 1 for all $x > R$. Thus, it does not ensure that there exists a prime between $\pi(x^2)$ and $\pi((x+1)^2)$. More generally, these simple bounds are not enough to prove that there exists a prime between $\pi(x^n)$ and $\pi((x+1)^n)$ for any positive integer $n > 1$.

== Generalizations ==
In 1919, Ramanujan (1887–1920) used properties of the Gamma function to give a simpler proof than Chebyshev. His short paper included a generalization of the postulate, from which would later arise the concept of Ramanujan primes. Further generalizations of Ramanujan primes have also been discovered; for instance, there is a proof that

$$2p_{i-n} > p_i \text{ for } i>k \text{ where } k=\pi(p_k)=\pi(R_n)\, ,$$

with $p_k$ the $k$-th prime and $R_n$ the $n$-th Ramanujan prime.

Other generalizations of Bertrand's postulate have been obtained using elementary methods. (In the following, $n$ runs through the set of positive integers.) In 1973, Denis Hanson proved that there exists a prime between $3n$ and $4n$. In 2006, apparently unaware of Hanson's result, M. El Bachraoui proposed a proof that there exists a prime between $2n$ and $3n$. El Bachraoui's proof is an extension of Erdős's arguments for the primes between $n$ and $2n$. Shevelev, Greathouse, and Moses (2013) discuss related results for similar intervals.

Bertrand's postulate over the Gaussian integers is an extension of the idea of the distribution of primes, but in this case on the complex plane. Thus, as Gaussian primes extend over the plane and not only along a line, and doubling a complex number is not simply multiplying by 2 but doubling its norm (multiplying by $1+i$), different definitions lead to different results, some are still conjectures, some proven.

== Sylvester's theorem ==
Bertrand's postulate was proposed for applications to permutation groups. Sylvester (1814–1897) generalized the weaker statement with the statement: the product of $k$ consecutive integers greater than $k$ is divisible by a prime greater than $k$. The result was discovered independently in 1929 by Issai Schur, and is now often known as the Sylvester–Schur theorem.

Bertrand's postulate follows from this result, by taking $k=n$, and considering the $k$ numbers $n+1, n+2, \dots, n+k=2n$, where $n > 1$. According to Sylvester's generalization, one of these numbers has a prime factor greater than $k$. Since all these numbers are less than $2(k+1)$, the number with a prime factor greater than $k$ has only one prime factor, and thus is a prime. Since $2n$ is not prime, we know there exists a prime $p$ with $n < p < 2n$.

== Erdős's theorems ==
In 1932, Erdős (1913–1996) published a simpler proof using binomial coefficients and the Chebyshev function $\vartheta$, defined as:

$$\vartheta(x) = \sum_{p=2}^x \log(p),$$

where p ≤ x runs over primes. See proof of Bertrand's postulate for the details.

Erdős proved in 1934 that for any positive integer $k$, there is a natural number $N$ such that for all $n>N$, there are at least $k$ primes between $n$ and $2n$. An equivalent statement had been proved in 1919 by Ramanujan (see Ramanujan prime).

== Better results ==
It follows from the prime number theorem that for any real $\varepsilon > 0$ there is a $n_0 > 0$ such that for all $n > n_0$ there is a prime $p$ such that $n < p < (1 + \varepsilon) n$. It can be shown, for instance, that

$$\lim_{n \to \infty}\frac{\pi((1+\varepsilon)n)-\pi(n)}{n/\log n} = \varepsilon,$$

which implies that $\pi (( 1 + \varepsilon ) n) - \pi (n)$ goes to infinity (and, in particular, is greater than 1 for sufficiently large $n$).

Non-asymptotic bounds have also been proved. In 1952, Jitsuro Nagura proved that for $n \ge 25$ there is always a prime between $n$ and $\bigl(1+\tfrac{1}{5} \bigr) n$.

In 1976, Lowell Schoenfeld showed that for $n \ge 2\,010\,760$, there is always a prime $p$ in the open interval $n < p < \bigl(1+\tfrac{1}{16\,597} \bigr) n$.

In his 1998 doctoral thesis, Pierre Dusart improved the above result, showing that for $k \ge 463$, $p_{k+1} \le \left( 1 + \frac{1}{2 \log^2{p_k}} \right) p_k$, and in particular for $x \ge 3\,275$, there exists a prime $p$ in the interval $x < p \le \left( 1 + \frac{1}{ 2 \log^2{x} } \right) x$.

In 2010 Pierre Dusart proved that for $x \ge 396\,738$ there is at least one prime $p$ in the interval $x < p \le \left( 1 + \frac{1}{ 25 \log^2{x} } \right) x$.

In 2016, Pierre Dusart improved his result from 2010, showing (Proposition 5.4) that if $x \ge 89\,693$, there is at least one prime $p$ in the interval $x < p \le \left( 1 + \frac{1}{ \log^3{x} } \right) x$. He also shows (Corollary 5.5) that for $x \ge 468\,991\,632$, there is at least one prime $p$ in the interval $x < p \le \left( 1 + \frac{1}{ 5\,000 \log^2{x} } \right) x$.

Baker, Harman and Pintz proved that there is a prime in the interval $[x-x^{0.525},\,x]$ for all sufficiently large $x$.

Dudek proved that for all $n \ge e^{e^{33.3}}$, there is at least one prime between $n^3$ and $(n + 1)^3$.

Dudek also proved that the Riemann hypothesis implies that for all $x \geq 2$ there is a prime $p$ satisfying

$x - \frac{4}{\pi} \sqrt{x} \log x < p \leq x.$

== Consequences ==
- The sequence of primes, along with 1, is a complete sequence; any positive integer can be written as a sum of primes (and 1) using each at most once.
- The only harmonic number that is an integer is the number 1.

== See also ==
- Oppermann's conjecture
- Prime gap
- Proof of Bertrand's postulate
- Ramanujan prime

== Bibliography ==
- P. Erdős (1934), "A Theorem of Sylvester and Schur", Journal of the London Mathematical Society, 9 (4): 282–288, doi:10.1112/jlms/s1-9.4.282
- Jitsuro Nagura (1952), "On the interval containing at least one prime number", Proc. Japan Acad., 28 (4): 177–181, doi:10.3792/pja/1195570997
- Chris Caldwell, Bertrand's postulate at Prime Pages glossary.
- H. Ricardo (2005), "Goldbach's Conjecture Implies Bertrand's Postulate", Amer. Math. Monthly, 112: 492
- Hugh L. Montgomery; Robert C. Vaughan (2007). Multiplicative number theory I. Classical theory. Cambridge tracts in advanced mathematics. Vol. 97. Cambridge: Cambridge Univ. Press. p. 49. ISBN 978-0-521-84903-6.
- J. Sondow (2009), "Ramanujan primes and Bertrand's postulate", Amer. Math. Monthly, 116 (7): 630–635, arXiv:0907.5232, doi:10.4169/193009709x458609
