= Helmut Maier =

German mathematician

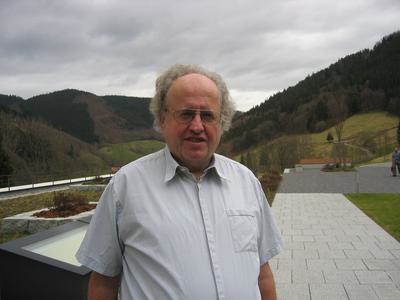
- Maier at Oberwolfach, 2008
- Born: 17 October 1953 (age 72); Geislingen an der Steige, Germany
- Education: University of Ulm; University of Minnesota (PhD)
- Known for: Maier's matrix method Maier's theorem
- Scientific career
- Fields: Mathematics
- Workplaces: University of Ulm; University of Michigan; Institute for Advanced Study, Princeton
- Doctoral advisor: J. Ian Richards

Helmut Maier (born 17 October 1953) is a German mathematician and professor at the University of Ulm, Germany. He is known for his contributions in analytic number theory and mathematical analysis and particularly for the so-called Maier's matrix method as well as Maier's theorem for primes in short intervals. He has also done important work in exponential sums and trigonometric sums over special sets of integers and the Riemann zeta function.

== Education ==
Helmut Maier graduated with a Diploma in Mathematics from the University of Ulm in 1976, under the supervision of Hans-Egon Richert. He received his PhD from the University of Minnesota in 1981, under the supervision of J. Ian Richards.

== Research and academic positions ==
Maier's PhD thesis was an extension of his paper Chains of large gaps between consecutive primes. In this paper Maier applied for the first time what is now known as Maier's matrix method. This method later on led him and other mathematicians to the discovery of unexpected irregularities in the distribution of prime numbers. There have been various other applications of Maier's Matrix Method, such as on irreducible polynomials and on strings of consecutive primes in the same residue class.

After postdoctoral positions at the University of Michigan and the Institute for Advanced Study, Princeton, Maier obtained a permanent position at the University of Georgia. While in Georgia he proved that the usual formulation of the Cramér model for the distribution of prime numbers is wrong. This was a completely unexpected result. Jointly with Carl Pomerance he studied the values of Euler's φ(n)-function and large gaps between primes. During the same period Maier investigated as well the size of the coefficients of cyclotomic polynomials and later collaborated with Sergei Konyagin and Eduard Wirsing on this topic. He also collaborated with Hugh Lowell Montgomery on the size of the sum of the Möbius function under the assumption of the Riemann Hypothesis. Maier and Gérald Tenenbaum in joint work investigated the sequence of divisors of integers, solving the famous propinquity problem of Paul Erdős. Since 1993, Maier has been a professor at the University of Ulm, Germany.

Collaborators of Helmut Maier include Paul Erdős, C. Feiler, John Friedlander, Andrew Granville, D. Haase, A. J. Hildebrand, Michel Laurent Lapidus, J. W. Neuberger, A. Sankaranarayanan, A. Sárközy, Wolfgang P. Schleich, Cameron Leigh Stewart.

== See also ==
- Maier's matrix method
- Maier's theorem
