= Andrica's conjecture =

Conjecture about gaps between prime numbers

(a) The function $A_n$ for the first 100 primes.

(b) The function $A_n$ for the first 200 primes.

(c) The function $A_n$ for the first 500 primes.

Graphical proof for Andrica's conjecture for the first (a)100, (b)200 and (c)500 prime numbers. It is conjectured that the function $A_n$ is always less than 1.

Andrica's conjecture (named after Romanian mathematician Dorin Andrica) is a conjecture regarding the gaps between prime numbers.

The conjecture states that the inequality

$$\sqrt{p_{n+1}} - \sqrt{p_n} < 1$$

holds for all $n$, where $p_n$ is the $n$-th prime number. If $g_n = p_{n+1} - p_n$ denotes the $n$-th prime gap, then Andrica's conjecture can also be rewritten as

$$g_n < 2\sqrt{p_n} + 1.$$

== Empirical evidence ==
Imran Ghory has used data on the largest prime gaps to confirm the conjecture for $n$ up to 1.3002×10^{16}. Using a more recent table of maximal gaps, the confirmation value can be extended exhaustively to 2×10^{19} > 2^{64}.

The discrete function $A_n = \sqrt{p_{n+1}}-\sqrt{p_n}$ is plotted in the figures opposite. The high-water marks for $A_n$ occur for n = 1, 2, and 4, with A_{4} ≈ 0.670873..., with no larger value among the first 10^{5} primes. Since the Andrica function decreases asymptotically as n increases, a prime gap of ever increasing size is needed to make the difference large as n becomes large. It therefore seems highly likely the conjecture is true, although this has not yet been proven.

The best proven bound on gap sizes is g_{n} < p_{n}^{0.525} (for n sufficiently large). Thus, using an inequality of p_{n}^{0.525}< 2p_{n}^{0.5}+1, the conjecture is verified for p_{n} up to 1.099532599291×10^{12}.

== Generalizations ==
Value of x in the generalized Andrica's conjecture for the first 100 primes, with the conjectured value of x_{min} labeled.

As a generalization of Andrica's conjecture, the following equation has been considered:

$$p _ {n+1} ^ x - p_ n ^ x = 1,$$

where $p_n$ is the nth prime and x can be any positive number.

The largest possible solution for x is easily seen to occur for n=1, when x_{max} = 1. The smallest solution for x is conjectured to be x_{min} ≈ 0.567148... (sequence A038458 in the OEIS) which occurs for n = 30.

This conjecture has also been stated as an inequality, the generalized Andrica conjecture:

$p _ {n+1} ^ x - p_ n ^ x < 1$ for $x < x_{\min}.$

== See also ==
- Cramér's conjecture
- Legendre's conjecture
- Firoozbakht's conjecture

== References and notes ==
- Guy, Richard K. (2004). "Section A8". Unsolved problems in number theory (3rd ed.). Springer-Verlag. ISBN 978-0-387-20860-2. Zbl 1058.11001.
