= Cramér's conjecture =

Estimation in number theory

In number theory, Cramér's conjecture, formulated by the Swedish mathematician Harald Cramér in 1936, is an estimate for the size of gaps between consecutive prime numbers: intuitively, that gaps between consecutive primes are always small, and the conjecture quantifies asymptotically just how small they must be. It states that

$$p_{n+1}-p_n=O((\log p_n)^2),$$

where p_{n} denotes the nth prime number, O is big O notation, and "log" is the natural logarithm. While this is the statement explicitly conjectured by Cramér, his heuristic actually supports the stronger statement

$$\limsup_{n\rightarrow\infty} \frac{p_{n+1}-p_n}{(\log p_n)^2} = 1,$$

or equivalently, for every ϵ > 0, there exists a bound B(ϵ) such that

$$p_{n+1}-p_n < (1+\epsilon) (\log p_n)^2\quad\text{for all }p_n \geq B(\epsilon)$$

and sometimes this formulation is called Cramér's conjecture. However, this stronger version is not supported by more accurate heuristic models, which nevertheless support the first version of Cramér's conjecture.

The strongest form of all, which was never claimed by Cramér but is the one used in experimental verification computations and the plot in this article, is simply

$$p_{n+1}-p_n < (\log p_n)^2.$$

None of the three forms have yet been proven or disproven.

== Conditional proven results on prime gaps ==
Cramér gave a conditional proof of the much weaker statement that

$$p_{n+1}-p_n = O(\sqrt{p_n}\,\log p_n)$$

on the assumption of the Riemann hypothesis. The best known unconditional upper bound is

$$p_{n+1}-p_n = O(p_n^{0.525})$$

due to Baker, Harman, and Pintz.

In the other direction, E. Westzynthius proved in 1931 that prime gaps grow more than logarithmically. That is,

$$\limsup_{n\to\infty}\frac{p_{n+1}-p_n}{\log p_n}=\infty.$$

His result was improved by R. A. Rankin, who proved that

$$\limsup_{n\to\infty}\frac{p_{n+1}-p_n}{\log p_n}\cdot\frac{\left(\log^{\circ 3} p_n\right)^2}{\log^{\circ 2} p_n\,\log^{\circ 4} p_n}>0,$$

where $\log^{\circ k}$ denotes the logarithm function iterated $k$ times, e.g. $\log^{\circ 3}p_n = \log\log\log p_n.$

Paul Erdős conjectured that the left-hand side of the above formula is infinite, and this was proven in 2014 by Kevin Ford, Ben Green, Sergei Konyagin, and Terence Tao, and independently by James Maynard.

The two approaches were subsequently combined by Ford, Green, Konyagin, Maynard, and Tao, who showed that, infinitely often,

$$p_{n+1}-p_n>\frac{c\,\log p_n\,\log^{\circ 2} p_n\,\log^{\circ 4} p_n}{\log^{\circ3} p_n},$$

where $c>0$ is an absolute constant.

In August 2026, a manuscript listing the OpenAI model GPT-5.6 Sol as its author gave the stronger bound

$$p_{n+1}-p_n>\frac{c\,\log p_n\,\log^{\circ2} p_n}{\log^{\circ4} p_n}$$

for infinitely many $n$, equivalently

$$G(X)\gg\frac{\log X\,\log^{\circ2} X}{\log^{\circ4} X},$$

where $G(X)$ denotes the largest gap between consecutive primes with upper endpoint at most $X$. This improves the 2018 Ford–Green–Konyagin–Maynard–Tao bound by a factor of

$$\frac{\log^{\circ3} X}{(\log^{\circ4} X)^2}.$$

Boris Alexeev subsequently released a formalization of the result in the Lean proof assistant. As of August 2026, the result had not appeared in a peer-reviewed publication, although the formalization provided a machine-checkable version of its main prime-gap bound.

== Heuristic justification ==
Cramér's conjecture is based on a probabilistic model—essentially a heuristic—in which the probability that a number of size x is prime is 1/log x. This is known as the Cramér random model or Cramér model of the primes.

In the Cramér random model,

$$\limsup_{n\rightarrow\infty} \frac{p_{n+1}-p_n}{\log^2 p_n} = 1$$

with probability one. However, as pointed out by Andrew Granville, Maier's theorem shows that the Cramér random model does not adequately describe the distribution of primes on short intervals, and a refinement of Cramér's model taking into account divisibility by small primes suggests that the limit should not be 1, but a constant $c \ge 2e^{-\gamma}\approx1.1229\ldots$ (OEIS: A125313), where $\gamma$ is the Euler–Mascheroni constant. János Pintz has suggested that the limit sup may be infinite, and similarly Leonard Adleman and Kevin McCurley write

As a result of the work of H. Maier on gaps between consecutive primes, the exact formulation of Cramér's conjecture has been called into question [...] It is still probably true that for every constant $c>2$, there is a constant $d>0$ such that there is a prime between $x$ and $x+d(\log x)^c$.

Similarly, Robin Visser writes

In fact, due to the work done by Granville, it is now widely believed that Cramér's conjecture is false. Indeed, there [are] some theorems concerning short intervals between primes, such as Maier's theorem, which contradict Cramér's model.

(internal references removed).

== Related conjectures and heuristics ==
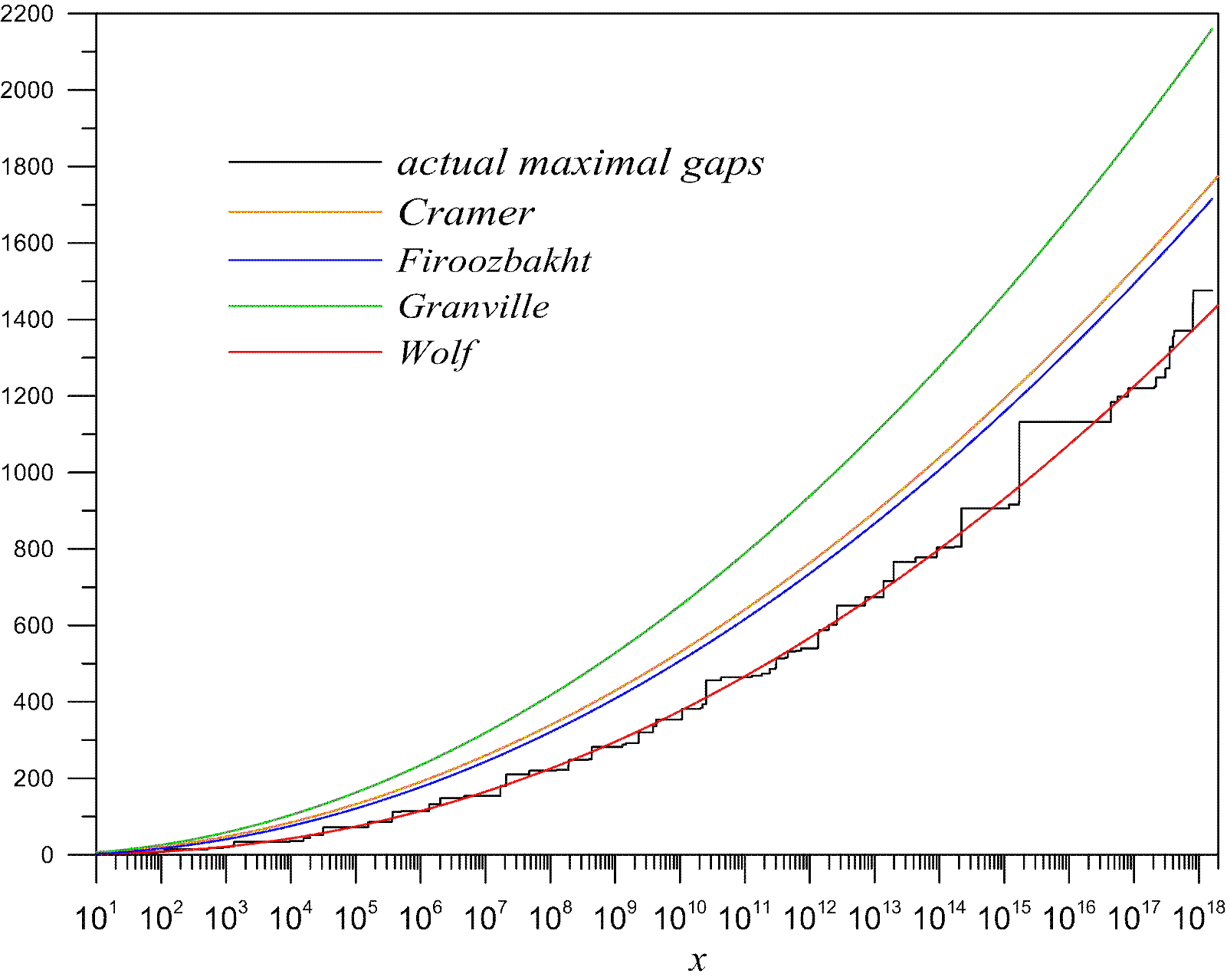
Prime gap function

Daniel Shanks conjectured the following asymptotic equality, stronger than Cramér's conjecture, for record gaps: $G(x)\sim \log^2 x.$

J.H. Cadwell has proposed the formula for the maximal gaps: $G(x)\sim \log^2 x - \log x\log\log x,$ which is formally identical to the Shanks conjecture but suggests a lower-order term.

Marek Wolf has proposed the formula for the maximal gaps $G(x)$ expressed in terms of the prime-counting function $\pi(x)$:

$$G(x)\sim \frac{x}{\pi(x)}(2\log\pi(x)-\log x+c),$$

where $c=\log(2C_2)=0.2778769...$ and $C_2=0.6601618...$ is the twin primes constant; see OEIS: A005597, A114907. This is again formally equivalent to the Shanks conjecture but suggests lower-order terms

$$G(x) \sim \log^2 x - 2\log x\log\log x - (1-c)\log x.$$.

Thomas Nicely has calculated many large prime gaps. He measures the quality of fit to Cramér's conjecture by measuring the ratio

$$R = \frac{\log p_n}{\sqrt{p_{n+1}-p_n}}.$$

He writes, "For the largest known maximal gaps, $R$ has remained near 1.13."

== See also ==
- Prime number theorem
- Legendre's conjecture and Andrica's conjecture, much weaker but still unproven upper bounds on prime gaps
- Firoozbakht's conjecture
- Maier's theorem on the numbers of primes in short intervals for which the model predicts an incorrect answer
