= Glyn Harman =

British mathematician

Glyn Harman (born 2 November 1956) is a British mathematician working in analytic number theory. One of his major interests is prime number theory. He is best known for results on gaps between primes and the greatest prime factor of p + a, as well as his lower bound for the number of Carmichael numbers up to X. His monograph, Prime-detecting Sieves (2007), was published by Princeton University Press. He has also written a book Metric Number Theory (1998). As well, he has contributed to the field of Diophantine approximation. Harman also proved that there are infinitely many primes (additive primes) whose sum of digits is prime. (the sequence A046704 in the OEIS).

Harman retired at the end of 2013 from being a professor at Royal Holloway, University of London. Previously, he was a professor at Cardiff University.

Harman is married and has three sons, and he used to live in Wokingham, Berkshire before moving to Harrow, Middlesex/Greater London and then Uxbridge.
