= Goldbach =

Goldbach may refer to:

== Places ==
=== Germany ===
==== Populated places ====
- Goldbach, Bavaria, a municipality in Bavaria
- Goldbach, Thuringia, a municipality in Thuringia
- Goldbach, a quarter of Crailsheim in Baden-Württemberg

==== Rivers ====
- Goldbach (Bode), a large stream in the Harz Mountains
- Goldbach (Tollense), a river of Mecklenburg-Vorpommern
- Goldbach (Este), a river of Lower Saxony, tributary of the Este
- Goldbach (Möhne), a river of North Rhine-Westphalia, tributary of the Möhne
- Goldbach (Eder), a river of Hesse, tributary of the Eder
- Goldbach (Ems), a river of Hesse, tributary of the Ems
- Goldbach (Münzbach), a river of Saxony, tributary of the Münzbach
- Goldbach (Bibers), a river of Baden-Württemberg, tributary of the Bibers
- Goldbach (Aschaff), a river of Bavaria, tributary of the Aschaff
- Goldbach (Kahl), a river of Bavaria, tributary of the Kahl
- Goldbach (Mangfall), a river of Bavaria, tributary of the Mangfall
- Goldbach (Pegnitz), a river of Bavaria, tributary of the Pegnitz

=== France ===
- Goldbach-Altenbach, a commune in the Haut-Rhin department in Alsace-Champagne-Ardenne-Lorraine

=== Switzerland ===
- Goldbach, part of Hasle bei Burgdorf, canton of Berne
- Goldbach, part of Lützelflüh, canton of Berne
- Goldbach, Zurich, part of Küsnacht ZH, canton of Zurich

== People ==
- Christian Goldbach, an 18th-century Prussian mathematician
- Sandra Goldbach, a German rower

== Mathematics ==
- Goldbach's conjecture, one of the oldest unsolved problems in number theory
- Goldbach's weak conjecture, also known as the odd Goldbach conjecture, the ternary Goldbach problem, or the 3-primes problem
- Goldbach's comet, a plot of the so-called Goldbach function
- Goldbach–Euler theorem, also known as Goldbach's theorem
