= Timeline of number theory =

A timeline of number theory.

== Before 1000 BCE ==
- ca. 20,000 BCE — Nile Valley, Ishango Bone: possibly the earliest reference to prime numbers and Egyptian multiplication although this is disputed.

== About 300 BCE ==
- 300 BCE — Euclid proves the number of prime numbers is infinite.

== 1st millennium AD ==
- 250 — Diophantus writes Arithmetica, one of the earliest treatises on algebra.
- 500 — Aryabhata solves the general linear diophantine equation.
- 628 – Brahmagupta gives Brahmagupta's identity and solves the so-called Pell's equation using his composition method.
- ca. 650 — Mathematicians in India create the Hindu–Arabic numeral system we use, including the zero, the decimals and negative numbers.

== 1000–1500 ==
- ca. 1000 — Abu-Mahmud al-Khujandi first states a special case of Fermat's Last Theorem.
- 895 — Thabit ibn Qurra gives a theorem by which pairs of amicable numbers can be found, (i.e., two numbers such that each is the sum of the proper divisors of the other).
- 975 — The earliest triangle of binomial coefficients (Pascal triangle) occur in the 10th century in commentaries on the Chandas Shastra.
- 1150 — Bhaskara II gives first general method for solving Pell's equation
- 1260 — Kamāl al-Dīn al-Fārisī gave a new proof of Thābit ibn Qurra's theorem, introducing important new ideas concerning factorization and combinatorial methods. He also gave the pair of amicable numbers 17296 and 18416 which have also been jointly attributed to Fermat as well as Thabit ibn Qurra.

== 17th century ==
- 1637 — Pierre de Fermat claims to have proven Fermat's Last Theorem in his copy of Diophantus' Arithmetica.

== 18th century ==
- 1742 — Christian Goldbach conjectures that every even number greater than two can be expressed as the sum of two primes, now known as Goldbach's conjecture.
- 1770 — Joseph Louis Lagrange proves the four-square theorem, that every positive integer is the sum of four squares of integers. In the same year, Edward Waring conjectures Waring's problem, that for any positive integer k, every positive integer is the sum of a fixed number of k^{th} powers.
- 1796 — Adrien-Marie Legendre conjectures the prime number theorem.

== 19th century ==
- 1801 — Disquisitiones Arithmeticae, Carl Friedrich Gauss's number theory treatise, is published in Latin.
- 1825 — Peter Gustav Lejeune Dirichlet and Adrien-Marie Legendre prove Fermat's Last Theorem for n = 5.
- 1832 — Lejeune Dirichlet proves Fermat's Last Theorem for n = 14.
- 1835 — Lejeune Dirichlet proves Dirichlet's theorem about prime numbers in arithmetic progressions.
- 1859 — Bernhard Riemann formulates the Riemann hypothesis which has strong implications about the distribution of prime numbers.
- 1896 — Jacques Hadamard and Charles Jean de la Vallée-Poussin independently prove the prime number theorem.
- 1896 — Hermann Minkowski presents Geometry of numbers.

== 20th century ==
- 1903 — Edmund Georg Hermann Landau gives considerably simpler proof of the prime number theorem.
- 1909 — David Hilbert proves Waring's problem.
- 1912 — Josip Plemelj publishes simplified proof for the Fermat's Last Theorem for exponent n = 5.
- 1913 — Srinivasa Aaiyangar Ramanujan sends a long list of complex theorems without proofs to G. H. Hardy.
- 1914 — Srinivasa Aaiyangar Ramanujan publishes Modular Equations and Approximations to π.
- 1910s — Srinivasa Aaiyangar Ramanujan develops over 3000 theorems, including properties of highly composite numbers, the partition function and its asymptotics, and mock theta functions. He also makes major breakthroughs and discoveries in the areas of gamma functions, modular forms, divergent series, hypergeometric series and prime number theory.
- 1919 — Viggo Brun defines Brun's constant B_{2} for twin primes.
- 1937 — I. M. Vinogradov proves Vinogradov's theorem that every sufficiently large odd integer is the sum of three primes, a close approach to proving Goldbach's weak conjecture.
- 1949 — Atle Selberg and Paul Erdős give the first elementary proof of the prime number theorem.
- 1966 — Chen Jingrun proves Chen's theorem, a close approach to proving the Goldbach conjecture.
- 1967 — Robert Langlands formulates the influential Langlands program of conjectures relating number theory and representation theory.
- 1983 — Gerd Faltings proves the Mordell conjecture and thereby shows that there are only finitely many whole number solutions for each exponent of Fermat's Last Theorem.
- 1994 — Andrew Wiles proves part of the Taniyama–Shimura conjecture and thereby proves Fermat's Last Theorem.
- 1999 — the full Taniyama–Shimura conjecture is proved.

== 21st century ==
- 2002 — Manindra Agrawal, Nitin Saxena, and Neeraj Kayal of IIT Kanpur present an unconditional deterministic polynomial time algorithm to determine whether a given number is prime.
- 2002 — Preda Mihăilescu proves Catalan's conjecture.
- 2004 — Ben Green and Terence Tao prove the Green–Tao theorem, which states that the sequence of prime numbers contains arbitrarily long arithmetic progressions.
