= Vaughan's identity =

Identity in analytic number theory

In mathematics and analytic number theory, Vaughan's identity is an identity found by R. C. Vaughan (1977) that can be used to simplify Vinogradov's work on trigonometric sums. It can be used to estimate summatory functions of the form

$$\sum_{n \leq N} f(n)\Lambda(n)$$

where f is some arithmetic function of the natural integers n, whose values in applications are often roots of unity, and Λ is the von Mangoldt function.

== Procedure for applying the method ==
The motivation for Vaughan's construction of his identity is briefly discussed at the beginning of Chapter 24 in Davenport. For now, we will skip over most of the technical details motivating the identity and its usage in applications, and instead focus on the setup of its construction by parts. Following from the reference, we construct four distinct sums based on the expansion of the logarithmic derivative of the Riemann zeta function in terms of functions which are partial Dirichlet series respectively truncated at the upper bounds of $U$ and $V$, respectively. More precisely, we define $F(s) = \sum_{m \leq U} \Lambda(m) m^{-s}$ and $G(s) = \sum_{d \leq V} \mu(d) d^{-s}$, which leads us to the exact identity that

$$-\frac{\zeta^{\prime}(s)}{\zeta(s)} = F(s) - \zeta(s) F(s) G(s) - \zeta^{\prime}(s) G(s) + \left(-\frac{\zeta^{\prime}(s)}{\zeta(s)} - F(s)\right) (1-\zeta(s) G(s)).$$

This last expansion implies that we can write

$$\Lambda(n) = a_1(n) + a_2(n) + a_3(n) + a_4(n),$$

where the component functions are defined to be

$$\begin{align}
a_1(n) & := \Biggl\{\begin{matrix} \Lambda(n), & \text{ if } n \leq U; \\ 0, & \text{ if } n > U\end{matrix} \\
a_2(n) & := - \sum_{\stackrel{mdr = n}{\stackrel{m \leq U}{d \leq V}}} \Lambda(m) \mu(d) \\
a_3(n) & := \sum_{\stackrel{hd=n}{d \leq V}} \mu(d) \log(h) \\
a_4(n) & := -\sum_{\stackrel{mk=n}{\stackrel{m > U}{k > 1}}} \Lambda(m) \left(\sum_{\stackrel{d|k}{d \leq V}} \mu(d)\right).
\end{align}$$

We then define the corresponding summatory functions for $1 \leq i \leq 4$ to be

$$S_i(N) := \sum_{n \leq N} f(n) a_i(n),$$

so that we can write

$$\sum_{n \leq N} f(n) \Lambda(n) = S_1(N) + S_2(N) + S_3(N) + S_4(N).$$

Finally, at the conclusion of a multi-page argument of technical and at times delicate estimations of these sums, we obtain the following form of Vaughan's identity when we assume that $|f(n)| \leq 1,\ \forall n$, $U,V \geq 2$, and $UV \leq N$:

$$\sum_{n \leq N} f(n) \Lambda(n) \ll U + (\log N) \times \sum_{t\leq UV}\left(\max_{w} \left|\sum_{w \leq r \leq \frac{N}{t}} f(rt)\right|\right) +
\sqrt{N} (\log N)^3 \times \max_{U \leq M \leq N/V} \max_{V \leq j \leq N/M}\left(\sum_{V < k \leq N/M} \left|
\sum_{\stackrel{M < m \leq 2M}{\stackrel{m \leq N/k}{m \leq N/j}}} f(mj) \bar{f(mk)}\right|\right)^{1/2} \mathbf{(V1)}.$$

It is remarked that in some instances sharper estimates can be obtained from Vaughan's identity by treating the component sum $S_2$ more carefully by expanding it in the form of

$$S_2 = \sum_{t \leq UV} \longmapsto \sum_{t \leq U} + \sum_{U < t \leq UV} =: S_2^{\prime} + S_2^{\prime\prime}.$$

The optimality of the upper bound obtained by applying Vaughan's identity appears to be application-dependent with respect to the best functions $U = f_U(N)$ and $V = f_V(N)$ we can choose to input into equation (V1). See the applications cited in the next section for specific examples that arise in the different contexts respectively considered by multiple authors.

== Applications ==
- Vaughan's identity has been used to simplify the proof of the Bombieri–Vinogradov theorem and to study Kummer sums (see the references and external links below).
- In Chapter 25 of Davenport, one application of Vaughan's identity is to estimate an important prime-related exponential sum of Vinogradov defined by

$$S(\alpha) := \sum_{n \leq N} \Lambda(n) e\left(n\alpha\right).$$

In particular, we obtain an asymptotic upper bound for these sums (typically evaluated at irrational $\alpha \in \mathbb{R} \setminus \mathbb{Q}$) whose rational approximations satisfy

$$\left| \alpha - \frac{a}{q} \right| \leq \frac{1}{q^2}, (a, q) = 1,$$

of the form

$$S(\alpha) \ll \left(\frac{N}{\sqrt{q}} + N^{4/5} + \sqrt{Nq}\right) (\log N)^4.$$

The argument for this estimate follows from Vaughan's identity by proving by a somewhat intricate argument that

$$S(\alpha) \ll \left(UV + q + \frac{N}{\sqrt{U}} + \frac{N}{\sqrt{V}} + \frac{N}{\sqrt{q}} + \sqrt{Nq}\right) (\log(qN))^4,$$

and then deducing the first formula above in the non-trivial cases when $q \leq N$ and with $U = V = N^{2/5}$.

- Another application of Vaughan's identity is found in Chapter 26 of Davenport where the method is employed to derive estimates for sums (exponential sums) of three primes.
- Examples of Vaughan's identity in practice are given as the following references / citations in this informative post:.

== Generalizations ==
Vaughan's identity was generalized by Heath-Brown (1982).
