= Olivier Ramaré =

French mathematician

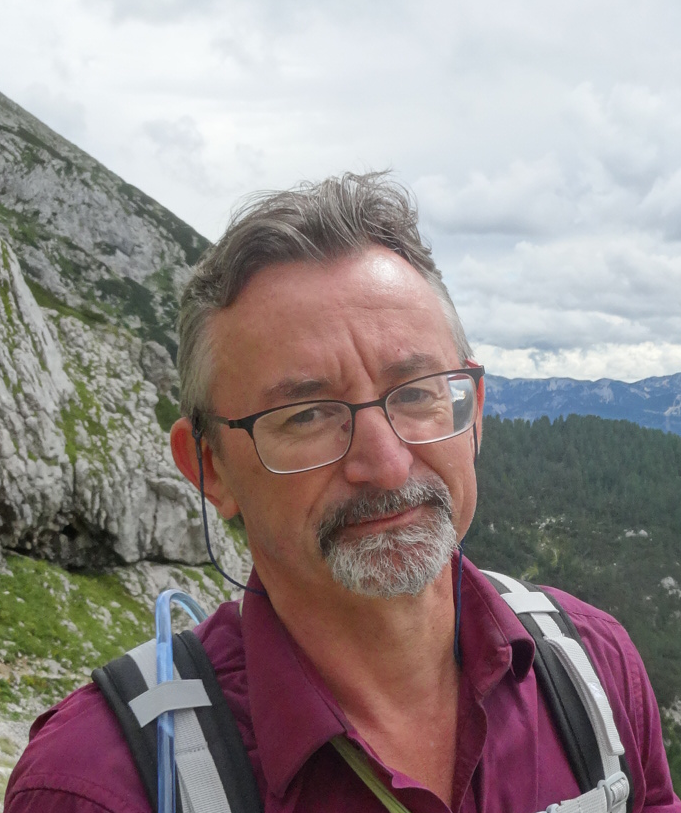

Olivier Ramaré is a French mathematician who works as Senior researcher for the CNRS. He is currently attached to Aix-Marseille Université.

Ramaré earned a doctorate in 1991 from the University of Bordeaux with a dissertation Contribution au problème de Goldbach : tout entier >1 est somme d'au plus treize nombres premiers (Contribution to Goldbach's problem: any integer >1 is the sum of at most thirteen prime numbers) supervised by Jean-Marc Deshouillers.

In 1995, he sharpened earlier work on Schnirelmann's theorem by proving that every even number is a sum of at most six primes. This result may be compared with Goldbach's conjecture, which states that every even number except 2 is the sum of two primes. The truth of Ramaré's result for all sufficiently large even numbers is a consequence of Vinogradov's theorem, whereas the full result follows from Goldbach's weak conjecture. In turn, Ramaré's result was strengthened by Terence Tao who proved in 2014 that every odd number is the sum of at most five primes. Harald Helfgott's claimed a proof of Goldbach's weak conjecture.
