= Waring–Goldbach problem =

On mathematics of sums of prime powers

The Waring–Goldbach problem is a problem in additive number theory, concerning the representation of integers as sums of powers of prime numbers. It is named as a combination of Waring's problem on sums of powers of integers, and the Goldbach conjecture on sums of primes. It was initiated by Hua Luogeng in 1938.

== Problem statement ==
It asks whether large numbers can be expressed as a sum, with at most a constant number of terms, of like powers of primes. That is, for any given positive integer $k$, is it true that all sufficiently large numbers can be written as $(p_1)^k+(p_2)^k+\cdots+(p_t)^k$, where $p_1,p_2,...,p_t$ are primes and $t$ is at most some constant value?

The case $k=1$ is a weak version of the Goldbach conjecture. Some progress has been made for $k \leqslant 7$.

== Heuristic justification ==
By the prime number theorem, the number of $k$^{th} powers of a prime below $X$ is of the order $\frac{\sqrt[k]{X}}{\log X}$. From this, heuristically, the number of sums of $t$ terms which are at most $X$ is roughly $\left(\frac{\sqrt[k]{X}}{\log X}\right)^t$. It is reasonable to assume that for some sufficiently large number $t$ this is $X-c$, i.e., all numbers up to $X$ are $t$-fold sums of $k$^{th} powers of primes. This argument is, of course, a long way from a strict proof.

== Relevant results ==
In his monograph, using and refining the methods of Hardy, Littlewood and Vinogradov, Hua Luogeng obtained $O(k^2\log k)$ upper bound for the number of terms required to exhibit all sufficiently large numbers as the sum of $k$^{th} powers of primes.

Every sufficiently large odd integer is the sum of 21 fifth powers of primes.
