= Vladimir Gennadievich Sprindzuk =

Soviet-Belarusian mathematician (1936–1987)

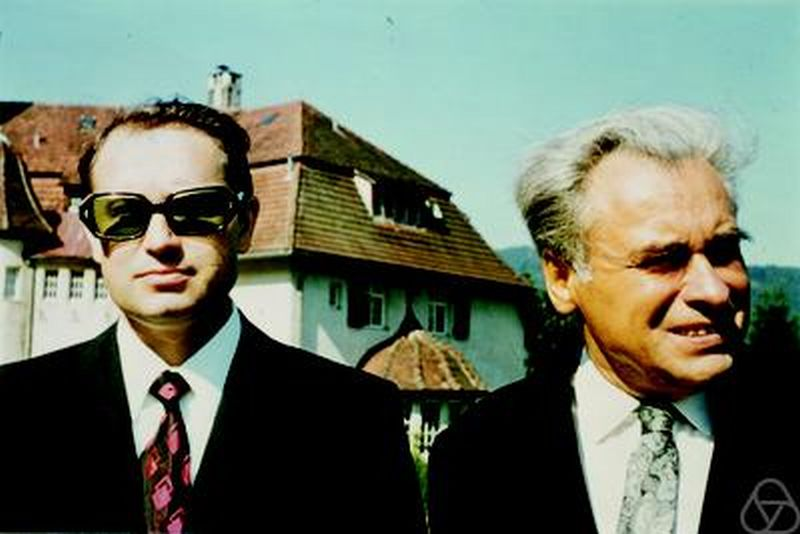
Sprindzuk (left) with Andrei Shidlovsky, 1974

Vladimir Gennadievich Sprindzuk (Russian Владимир Геннадьевич Спринджук, Belarusian Уладзімір Генадзевіч Спрынджук, 22 July 1936, Minsk – 26 July 1987) was a Soviet-Belarusian number theorist.

== Education and career ==
Sprindzuk studied from 1954 at Belarusian State University and from 1959 at the University of Vilnius. There he received in 1963 his Ph.D. with Jonas Kubilius as primary advisor and Yuri Linnik as secondary advisor and with thesis entitled (in Russian) "Метрические теоремы о диофантовых приближениях алгебраическими числами ограниченной степени" (Metric Theorems of Diophantine Approximations and Approximations by Algebraic Numbers of Bounded Degree). In 1965 he received his Russian doctorate of sciences (Doctor Nauk) from the State University of Leningrad with thesis entitled (in Russian) "Проблема Малера в метрической теории чисел" (The Mahler Problem in the Metric Theory of Numbers). In 1969 he became a professor and head of the academic division of number theory at the Mathematical Institute of the National Academy of Sciences of Belarus in Minsk and lectured at the Belarusian State University in Minsk. He was a visiting professor at the University of Paris, at the Polish Academy of Sciences and at the Slovak Academy of Sciences.

Sprindzuk's research deals with Diophantine approximation, Diophantine equations and transcendental numbers. While a first year undergraduate student, he published his first paper, in which he solved a problem of Aleksandr Khinchin, and wrote to Khinchin about the solution. Another important influence was the Leningrad number theorist Yuri Linnik, who was Sprindzuk's advisor for his Russian doctorate of sciences. In 1965 Sprindzuk proved a conjecture of Mahler, that almost all real numbers are S-numbers of Type 1 — Mahler had previously proved that almost all real numbers are S-numbers. Sprindzuk generalized an important theorem proved by Wolfgang M. Schmidt.

In the late sixties V. Sprindzuk began studying the theory of transcendental numbers and Diophantine equations. In 1969-71 he investigated the arithmetic properties of the Siegel hypergeometric E- functions with algebraic parameters and defined a wider class of E*-functions. His detailed studies of the Thue equation in algebraic number fields proved to be useful for the effective solution of a wide class of Diophantine equations and allowed him to study the possibility of effective approximations to algebraic numbers both in archimedean and non-archimedean domains. Sprindzuk's results are based on the connections between linear forms of logarithms in different norms. He observed that if a linear form is p-adically "not too small" then it cannot be too small in any other norm, be it archimedean or non-archimedean. A quantitative variant of this criterion led Sprindzuk to several effective results concerning the representation of numbers by binary forms, estimates for the magnitude of maximal prime factor of a binary form and the rational approximations to algebraic integers. He discovered in particular, a relation between the magnitude of the solutions of Diophantine equations and the number of classes of ideals, as well as some constructions of algebraic fields with the large class number.

He was elected in 1969 a corresponding member and in 1986 a full member of the National Academy of Sciences of Belarus. Beginning in 1970 he was on the editorial staff of Acta Arithmetica. In 1970 he was an Invited Speaker at the ICM in Nice with talk New applications of analytic and p-adic methods in diophantine approximations.

The theory of transcendental numbers, initiated by Liouville in 1844, has been enriched greatly in recent years. Among the relevant profound contributions are those of A. Baker, W. M. Schmidt and V. G. Sprindzuk.

== Selected publications ==
=== Articles ===
- "Achievements and problems in the theory of Diophantine approximations". Russian Math. Surveys. 35 (4): 1–80. 1980. doi:10.1070/RM1980v035n04ABEH001861.

=== Books ===
- Mahler’s Problem in metric number theory. American Mathematical Society 1969 (translation from Russian original, Minsk 1967)
- Metric theory of Diophantine approximations. Winston and Sons, Washington D.C. 1979 (translation from Russian original, published Nauka, Moscow 1977)
- Classical Diophantine Equations. Springer, Lecture Notes in Mathematics vol. 1559, 1993 (translation from Russian original, Moscow 1982)
