= R. K. Rubugunday =

Indian mathematician

Raghunath Krishna Rubugunday
- Born: 1918; Madras
- Died: 2000 (aged 81–82)
- Known for: Waring's problem
- Scientific career
- Fields: Mathematics

Raghunath Krishna Rubugunday (1918–2000) was an Indian mathematician specializing in number theory notable for his contribution to Waring's problem.

Rubugunday was born in Madras in 1918. The famous mathematician K. Ananda Rau was an uncle on his father's side. He completed his B.A. Hons from Presidency College, Madras and Tripos from Cambridge in 1938. He returned to India and among other positions he was the Head of the Department of Mathematics at Saugar university.
