= Theodor Estermann =

German-Jewish mathematician

Theodor Estermann (5 February 1902 – 29 November 1991) was a German-born British mathematician, working in the field of analytic number theory. The Estermann measure, a measure of the central symmetry of a convex set in the Euclidean plane, is named after him.

He was born in Neubrandenburg, Germany, "to keen Zionists who named him in honour of Herzl." His doctorate, completed in 1925, was supervised by Hans Rademacher. He spent most of his career at University College London, eventually as a professor. Heini Halberstam, Klaus Roth and Robert Charles Vaughan were Ph.D. students of his.

Though Estermann left Germany in 1929, before the Nazis seized power in 1933, some historians count him among the early emigrants who fled Nazi Germany.

The physicist Immanuel Estermann was the brother of Theodor Estermann.
