= Goldbach–Euler theorem =

Convergent series relating reciprocals of perfect powers

In mathematics, the Goldbach–Euler theorem (also known as Goldbach's theorem), states that the sum of 1/(p − 1) over the set of perfect powers p, excluding 1 and omitting repetitions, converges to 1:

$$\sum_{p}^{\infty }\frac{1}{p-1}= {\frac{1}{3} +  \frac{1}{7} + \frac{1}{8}+ \frac{1}{15} + \frac{1}{24} + \frac{1}{26}+ \frac{1}{31}}+ \cdots = 1.$$

This result was first published in Euler's 1737 paper "Variæ observationes circa series infinitas". Euler attributed the result to a letter (now lost) from Goldbach.

== Original proof ==
Goldbach's original proof to Euler involved assigning a constant to the harmonic series: $\textstyle x = \sum_{n=1}^\infty \frac{1}{n}$, which is divergent. Such a proof is not considered rigorous by modern standards. There is a strong resemblance between the method of sieving out powers employed in his proof and the method of factorization used to derive Euler's product formula for the Riemann zeta function.

Let $x$ be given by

$$x = 1 + \frac{1}{2} + \frac{1}{3} + \frac{1}{4} + \frac{1}{5} + \frac{1}{6} + \frac{1}{7} + \frac{1}{8} + \cdots$$

Since the sum of the reciprocal of every power of 2 is $\textstyle 1 = \frac{1}{2} + \frac{1}{4} + \frac{1}{8} + \frac{1}{16} + \cdots$, subtracting the terms with powers of 2 from $x$ gives

$$x - 1 = 1 + \frac{1}{3} + \frac{1}{5} + \frac{1}{6} + \frac{1}{7} + \frac{1}{9} + \frac{1}{10} + \frac{1}{11} + \cdots$$

Repeat the process with the terms with the powers of 3: $\textstyle \frac{1}{2} = \frac{1}{3} + \frac{1}{9} + \frac{1}{27} + \frac{1}{81} + \cdots$

$$x - 1 - \frac{1}{2} = 1 + \frac{1}{5} + \frac{1}{6} + \frac{1}{7} + \frac{1}{10} + \frac{1}{11} + \frac{1}{12} + \cdots$$

Absent from the above sum are now all terms with powers of 2 and 3. Continue the process by removing terms with powers of 5, 6, 7, 10 and so on (4, 8 and 9 have been removed with 2 and 3 already) until the right side is exhausted to the value of 1. Eventually, we obtain the equation

$$x - 1 - \frac{1}{2} - \frac{1}{4} - \frac{1}{5} - \frac{1}{6} - \frac{1}{9} - \cdots = 1$$

which we rearrange into

$$x - 1 = 1 + \frac{1}{2} + \frac{1}{4} + \frac{1}{5} + \frac{1}{6} + \frac{1}{9} + \cdots$$

where the denominators consist of all positive integers that are the non-powers minus 1. By subtracting the previous equation from the definition of $x$ given above, we obtain

$$1 = \frac{1}{3} +  \frac{1}{7} + \frac{1}{8}+ \frac{1}{15} + \frac{1}{24} + \frac{1}{26}+ \frac{1}{31} + \cdots$$

where the denominators now consist only of perfect powers minus 1.

While lacking mathematical rigor, Goldbach's proof provides a reasonably intuitive argument for the theorem's truth. Rigorous proofs require proper and more careful treatment of the divergent terms of the harmonic series. Other proofs make use of the fact that the sum of 1/(p − 1) over the set of perfect powers p, excluding 1 but including repetitions, converges to 1 by demonstrating the equivalence:

$$\sum_p^\infty \frac{1}{p - 1} = \sum_{m=2}^\infty \sum_{n=2}^\infty \frac 1 {m^n} = 1.$$

== See also ==
- Goldbach's conjecture
- List of sums of reciprocals
