= Yuri Linnik =

Soviet mathematician (1915–1972)

- Born: Yuri Vladimirovich Linnik; January 8, 1915; Bila Tserkva, Russian Empire
- Died: June 30, 1972 (aged 57); Leningrad, Soviet Union
- Education: Saint Petersburg University; Steklov Institute
- Scientific career
- Fields: Mathematics
- Workplaces: Saint Petersburg University

Yuri Vladimirovich Linnik (Russian: Ю́рий Влади́мирович Ли́нник; January 8, 1915 – June 30, 1972) was a Soviet mathematician active in number theory, probability theory and mathematical statistics.

== Biography ==
Linnik was born in Bila Tserkva, in present-day Ukraine. He went to Saint Petersburg University where his supervisor was Vladimir Tartakovsky, and later worked at that university and the Steklov Institute. He was a member of the Academy of Sciences of the Soviet Union, as was his father, Vladimir Pavlovich Linnik. He was awarded both Stalin and Lenin Prizes. He died in Leningrad.

== Work in number theory ==
- Linnik's theorem in analytic number theory
- The dispersion method (which allowed him to solve the Titchmarsh problem).
- The large sieve (which turned out to be extremely influential).
- An elementary proof of the Hilbert-Waring theorem; see also Schnirelmann density.
- The Linnik ergodic method, see Linnik (1968), which allowed him to study the distribution properties of the representations of integers by integral ternary quadratic forms.

== Work in probability theory and statistics ==
=== Infinitely divisible distributions ===
Linnik obtained numerous results concerning infinitely divisible distributions. In particular, he proved the following generalisation of Cramér's theorem: any divisor of a convolution of Gaussian and Poisson random variables is also a convolution of Gaussian and Poisson.

He has also coauthored the book Linnik & Ostrovskii (1977) on the arithmetics of infinitely divisible distributions.

=== Central limit theorem ===
- Linnik zones (zones of asymptotic normality)
- Information-theoretic proof of the central limit theorem

=== Statistics ===
- Behrens–Fisher problem

== Selected publications ==
- Linnik, Yu.V. (1971), Independent and stationary sequences of random variables, Series of Monographs and Textbooks on Pure and Applied Mathematics, Groningen: Wolters-Noordhoff Publishing
- Linnik, Yu.V. (1961), Method of least squares and principles of the theory of observations, New York-Oxford-London-Paris: Pergamon Press, MR 0124121
- Linnik, Yu.V.; Ostrovskii, I.V. (1977), Decomposition of random variables and vectors, Translations of Mathematical Monographs, vol. 48, Providence, R.I.: American Mathematical Society
- Linnik, Yu.V. (1968), Ergodic properties of algebraic fields, Ergebnisse der Mathematik und ihrer Grenzgebiete, vol. 45, New York: Springer-Verlag New York Inc.
