= Nikolai Chudakov =

Nikolai Grigor'evich Chudakov (Russian: Никола́й Григо́рьевич Чудако́в; 1904–1986) was a Russian and Soviet mathematician. He was born in Lysovsk, Novo-Burassk, Saratov, Russian Empire. His father worked as a medical assistant.

== Biography ==
He first studied at the Faculty of Physics and Mathematics at Saratov State University, but then he transferred to Moscow University. He then graduated in 1927. In 1930, he was named head of higher mathematics at Saratov University. In 1936, he successfully defended his thesis and became a Doctor of Science. Among others, he considerably improved a result from Guido Hoheisel and Hans Heilbronn on an upper bound for prime gaps. He worked in Moscow until 1940, but then he reconnected with Saratov.
