= Goldbach (Möhne) =

River of North Rhine-Westphalia, Germany

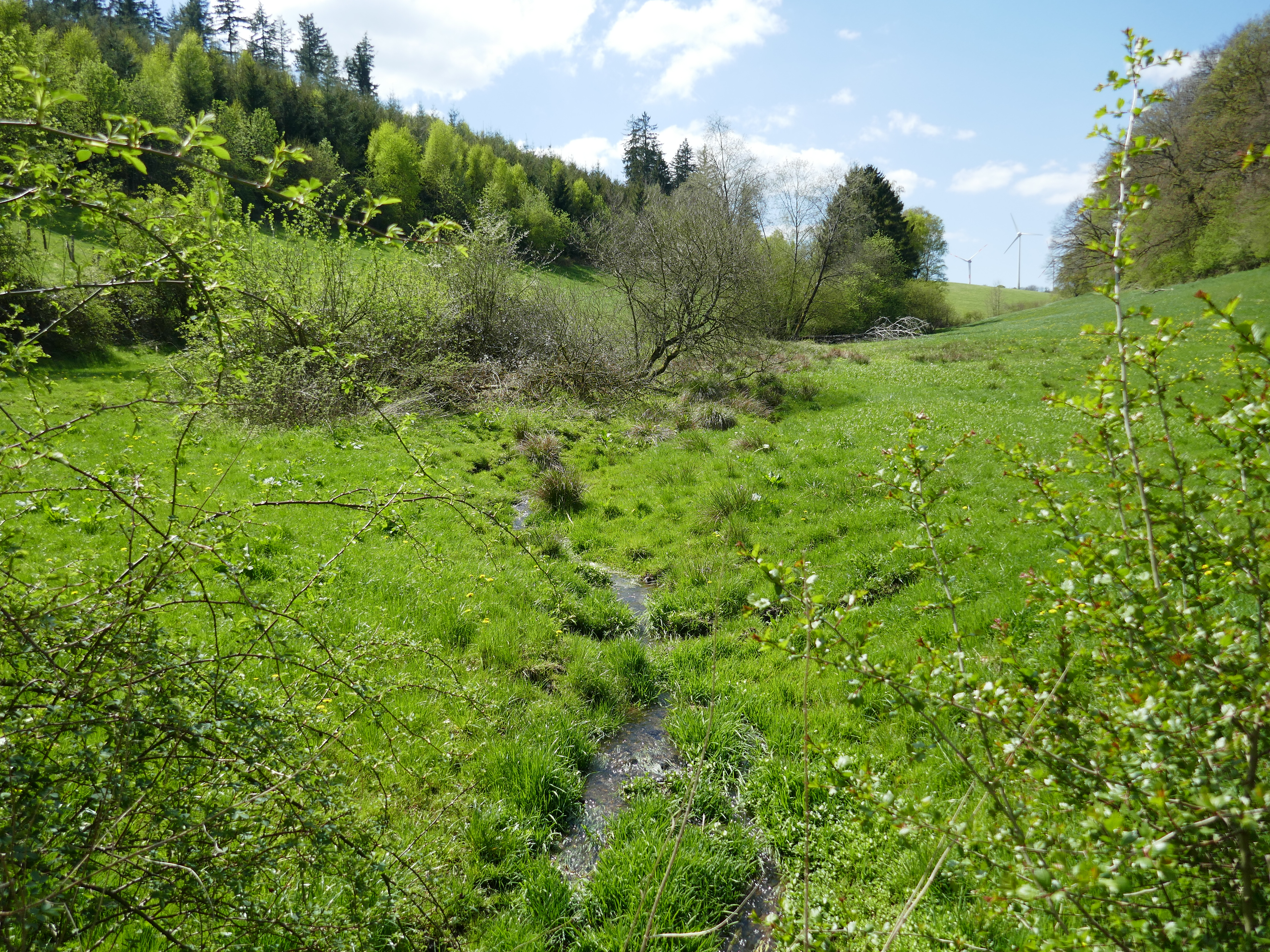

Location
- Country: Germany
- States: North Rhine-Westphalia

Physical characteristics
- Mouth
  - location: Möhne
  - coordinates: 51.4297°N 8.5736°E

Basin features
- Progression: Möhne→ Ruhr→ Rhine→ North Sea

Goldbach (German pronunciation: [ˈɡɔltbax]) is a small river of North Rhine-Westphalia, Germany. It is a left tributary of the Möhne near Brilon.

== Similar streams by name ==
It should not be confused with the six other streams in North Rhine-Westphalia that bear same the name. They are tributaries of the Mehlemer Bach, Hürholzer Siefen, Seseke, Wurm, Düte and Beberbach.

== See also ==
- List of rivers of North Rhine-Westphalia
