= Goldbach's comet =

Mathematical plot of the Goldbach function

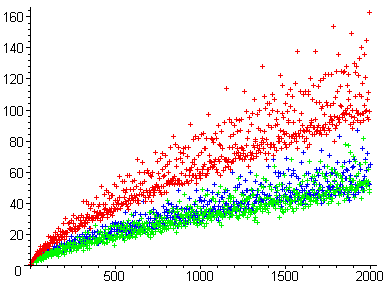
Goldbach's comet up to the integer 2000. Red points are multiples of 6, blue points are integers that are 2 modulo 6, and green points are 4 modulo 6.

Goldbach's comet is the name given to a plot of the function g(E), the so-called Goldbach function (sequence A002372 in the OEIS). The function, studied in relation to Goldbach's conjecture, is defined for all even integers E > 2 to be the number of different ways in which E can be expressed as the sum of two primes. For example, g(22) = 3 since 22 can be expressed as the sum of two primes in three different ways (22 = 11 + 11 = 5 + 17 = 3 + 19).

== Properties ==
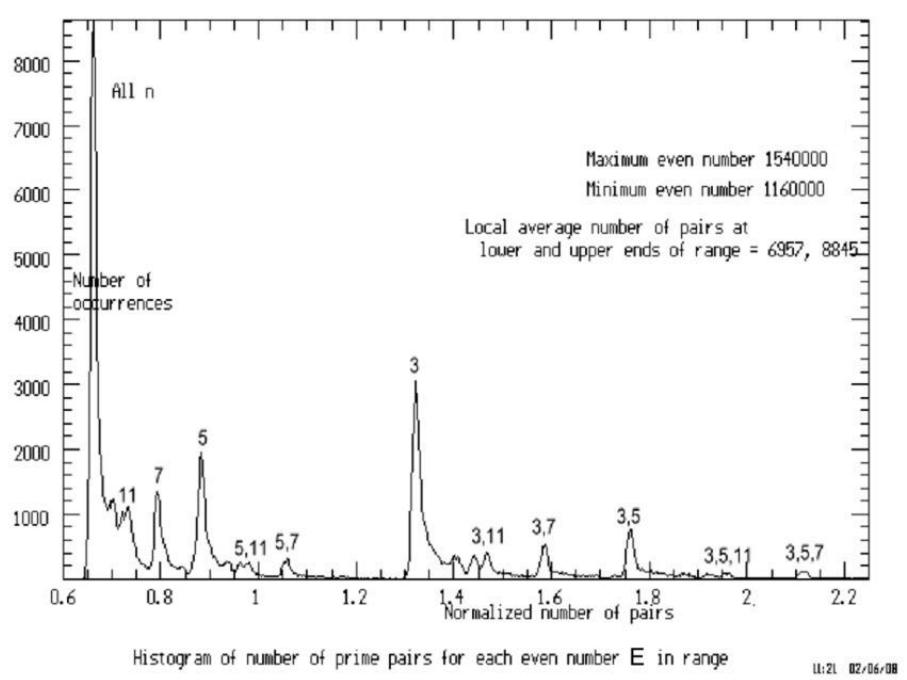

An illuminating way of presenting the comet data is as a histogram. The function g(E) can be normalised by dividing by the locally averaged value of g, g_{av}, taken over perhaps 1000 neighbouring values of the even number E. The histogram can then be accumulated over a range of up to about 10% either side of a central E.

Such a histogram appears on the right. A series of well-defined peaks is evident. Each of these peaks can be identified as being formed by a set of values of E/2 which have certain smallest factors. The major peaks correspond to lowest factors of 3, 5, 7, ... as labelled. As the lowest factors become higher the peaks move left and eventually merge to give the lowest-value primary peak.

There is in fact a hierarchy of peaks; the main peaks are composed of subsidiary peaks, with a succession of second-smallest factors of E/2. This hierarchy continues until all factors are exhausted.

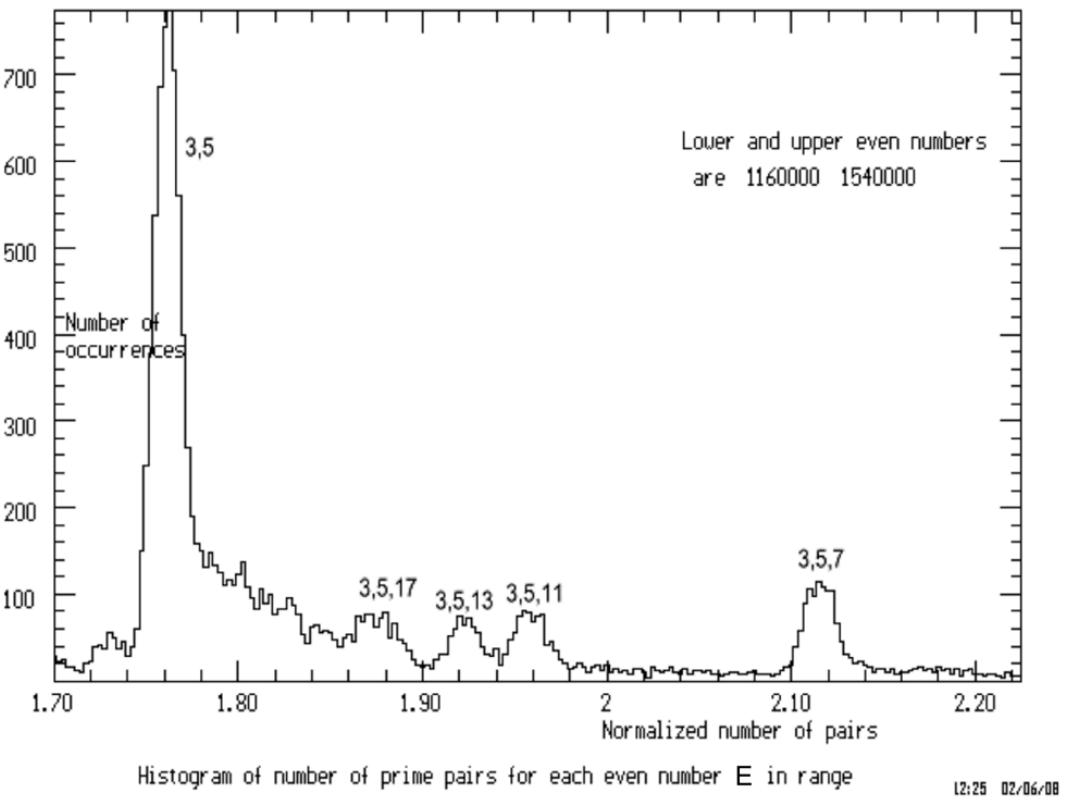

The magnified section shows the succession of subsidiary peaks in more detail.

The relative location of the peaks follows from the form developed by Hardy and Littlewood:

g(E) / g_{av} = Π_{2} ∏ [(p − 1) / (p − 2)] (1)

where the product is taken over all distinct odd prime factors p of E/2. The factor Π_{2} is Hardy–Littlewood's twin prime constant,

Π_{2} = ∏_{p > 2} [1 − 1 / (p − 1)^{2}] ≈ 0.6601618...

Here the product is taken over all primes greater than 2.

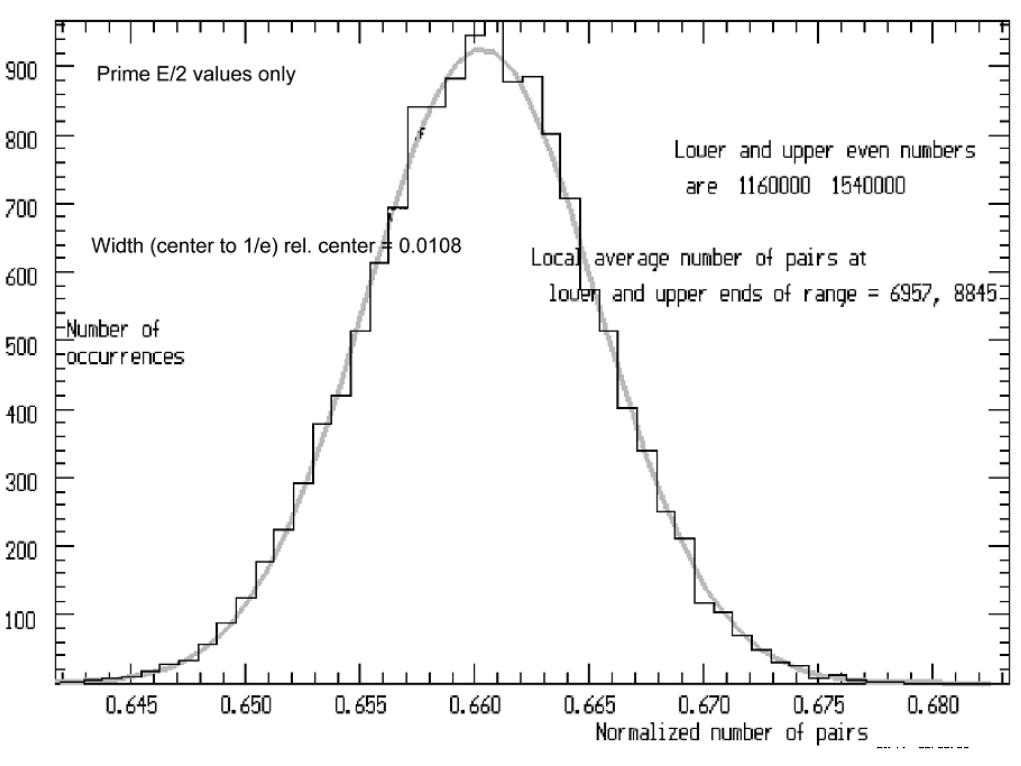

Of particular interest is the peak formed by selecting only values of E/2 that are prime. The product factor in equation (1) is then very close to 1. The peak is very close to a Gaussian form (shown in grey). For this range of E values, the peak location is within 0.03% of the ideal Π_{2}.

When histograms are formed for different average values of E, the width of this (primes-only) peak is found to be proportional to 1 / √(g_{pav}(E)). However, it is a factor of about 1.85 less than the value √(2 / g_{pav}(E)) that would be expected from a hypothesis of totally random occurrence of prime-pair matching. This may be expected, since there are correlations that give rise to the separated peaks in the total histogram.

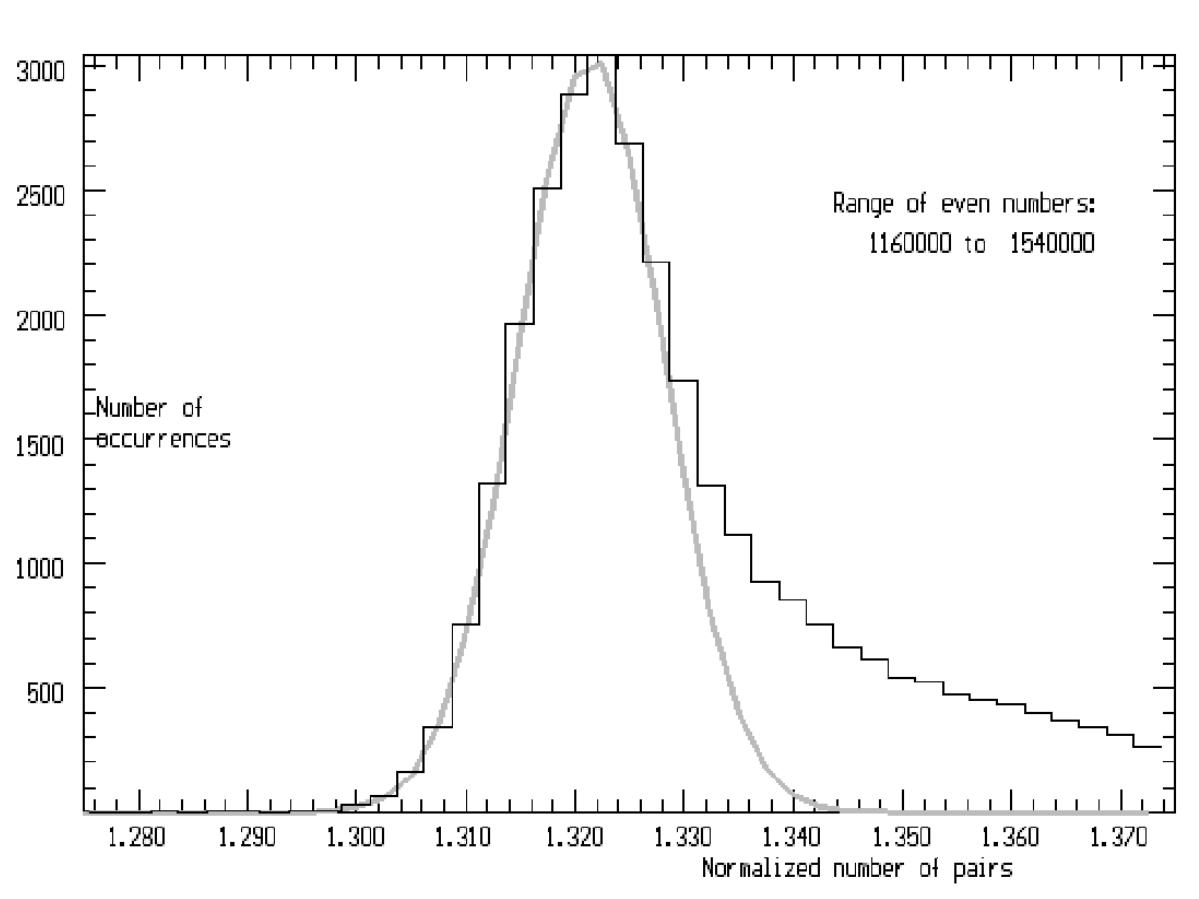

Returning to the full range of E/2 rather than just primes, it is seen that other peaks associated with specified lowest factors of E/2 can also be fitted by a Gaussian, but only on their lower shoulder. The upper shoulder, being formed by an aggregate of subsidiary peaks, lies above the simple Gaussian form.

The relative heights of the peaks in the total histogram are representative of the populations of various types of E/2 having differing factors. The heights are approximately inversely proportional to ∏ p, the product of the specified lowest prime factors. Thus the height of the peak marked (3,5) in the overall histogram is about 1/15 of the main peak. Heights may vary from this by about 20%; their exact value is a complex function of the way in which the peaks are constituted from their components and of their varying width.

It is interesting to speculate on the possibility of any number E having zero prime pairs, taking these Gaussian forms as probabilities, and assuming it is legitimate to extrapolate to the zero-pair point. If this is done, the probability of zero pairs for any one E, in the range considered here, is of order 10^{−3700}. The integrated probability over all E to infinity, taking into account the narrowing of the peak width, is not much larger. Any search for violation of the Goldbach conjecture may reasonably be expected to have these odds to contend with.
