= Waring's problem =

Mathematical problem in number theory

In number theory, Waring's problem asks whether each natural number k has an associated positive integer s such that every natural number is the sum of at most s natural numbers raised to the power k. For example, every natural number is the sum of at most 4 squares, 9 cubes, or 19 fourth powers. Waring's problem was proposed in 1770 by Edward Waring, after whom it is named. Its affirmative answer, known as the Hilbert–Waring theorem, was provided by Hilbert in 1909. Waring's problem has its own Mathematics Subject Classification, 11P05, "Waring's problem and variants".

== Relationship with Lagrange's four-square theorem ==
Long before Waring posed his problem, Diophantus had asked whether every positive integer could be represented as the sum of four perfect squares greater than or equal to zero. This question later became known as Bachet's conjecture, after the 1621 translation of Diophantus's Arithmetica by Claude Gaspard Bachet de Méziriac. In 1640, Fermat claimed to have a proof, but did not publish it, and it was solved by Joseph-Louis Lagrange in his four-square theorem in 1770, the same year Waring made his conjecture. Waring sought to generalize this problem by trying to represent all positive integers as the sum of cubes, integers to the fourth power, and so forth, to show that any positive integer may be represented as the sum of other integers raised to a specific exponent, and that there was always a maximum number of integers raised to a certain exponent required to represent all positive integers in this way.

== The number g(k) ==
For every $k$, let $g(k)$ denote the minimum number $s$ of $k$th powers of naturals needed to represent all positive integers. Every positive integer is the sum of one first power, itself, so $g(1) = 1$. Some simple computations show that 7 requires 4 squares, 23 requires 9 cubes, and 79 requires 19 fourth powers; these examples show that $g(2) \ge 4$, $g(3) \ge 9$, and $g(4) \ge 19$. Waring conjectured that these lower bounds were in fact exact values.

Lagrange's four-square theorem of 1770 states that every natural number is the sum of at most four squares, which establishes $g(2) = 4$. Over the years various bounds were established, using increasingly sophisticated and complex proof techniques. For example, Liouville showed that $g(4)$ is at most 53. Hardy and Littlewood showed that all sufficiently large numbers are the sum of at most 19 fourth powers.

Exact values for g(k)
Value	Year of discovery	Author
g(2) = 4	1770	J.-L. Lagrange
g(3) = 9	1909–1912	A. Wieferich; A gap in the proof was filled by A. J. Kempner in 1912
g(4) = 19	1986	R. Balasubramanian, J.-M. Deshouillers and F. Dress
g(5) = 37	1964	J. R. Chen and J. H. Conway (independently)
g(6) = 73	1940	S. S. Pillai
g(7) = 143	1936	L. E. Dickson and S. S. Pillai (independently)
g(k), k > 7	1936–1944	L. E. Dickson and S. S. Pillai (independently) in 1936, for almost all cases, the rest of which were treated by R. K. Rubugunday in 1942 and I. M. Niven in 1944

Let $q$ and $r$ be defined by the Euclidean division
$$3^k = 2^k q + r, \quad 0 \le r < 2^k,$$
or explicitly by $q = \lfloor(3/2)^k\rfloor$ and $r = 2^k \{(3/2)^k\}$, where $\lfloor x\rfloor$ and $\{x\}$ respectively denote the integral and fractional part of a real number $x$.

Since the number $2^k q - 1$ is less than $3^k$, as a sum of integer powers, it can only be expressed using $1^k$ and $2^k$. Using modular arithmetic, one shows that the fewest number of terms is achieved by the formula
$$2^k q - 1 = \underbrace{1^k + \ldots + 1^k}_{2^k-1 \text{ times}} + \underbrace{2^k + \ldots + 2^k}_{q - 1 \text{ times}},$$
and it follows that
$$g(k) \ge 2^k + q - 2,$$
which was noted by J. A. Euler in about 1772. Let $4^k = 3^k d + s,\, 0 \le s < 3^k$. Combined work from the authors quoted above has led to the formula, valid for all $k$:
$$g(k) = \begin{cases}
2^k + q - 2 &\text{if }~ q + r \le 2^k \\
2^k + q + d - 2 &\text{if }~ q + r > 2^k ~\text{ and }~ q d + q + d = 2^k \\
2^k + q + d - 3 &\text{if }~ q + r > 2^k  ~\text{ and }~ q d + q + d > 2^k.
\end{cases}$$
Dickson and Pillai both independently proved the first case, for $q + r \le 2^k - 3$, and the two other cases, and they noted that $q + r \neq 2^k - 1$ for $k > 1$. Rubugunday proved that $q + r \neq 2^k$ for all $k$, leaving the final case $q + r = 2^k - 2$ open. In this scenario, Niven proved that $g(k) = 2^k + q - 2$.

No value of $k$ is known for which the hypothesis $q + r > 2^k$ in the last two cases holds. Mahler proved that there can only be a finite number of such $k$. Kubina and Wunderlich, extending work of Stemmler, have shown that any such $k$ must satisfy $k > 471\,600\,000$. It is conjectured that there are no such $k$; in that case, $g(k) = 2^k + q - 2$ for every positive integer $k$.

The first few values of $g(k)$ are

1, 4, 9, 19, 37, 73, 143, 279, 548, 1079, 2132, 4223, 8384, 16673, 33203, 66190, 132055, 263619, 526502, 1051899, ... (sequence A002804 in the OEIS).

== The number G(k) ==
From the work of Hardy and Littlewood, the related quantity G(k) was studied with g(k). G(k) is defined to be the least positive integer s such that every sufficiently large integer (i.e. every integer greater than some constant) can be represented as a sum of at most s positive integers to the power of k. Clearly, G(1) = 1. Since squares are congruent to 0, 1, or 4 (mod 8) (and also to 0, 1, or 4 (mod 5)) , no integer congruent to 7 (mod 8) can be represented as a sum of three squares, implying that G(2) ≥ 4. Since G(k) ≤ g(k) for all k, this shows that G(2) = 4. Davenport showed that G(4) = 16 in 1939, by demonstrating that any sufficiently large number congruent to 1 through 14 mod 16 could be written as a sum of 14 fourth powers (Vaughan in 1986 and 1989 reduced the 14 biquadrates successively to 13 and 12). The exact value of G(k) is unknown for any other k, but there exist bounds.

=== Lower bounds for G(k) ===
Bounds
1 = G(1) = 1
4 = G(2) = 4
4 ≤ G(3) ≤ 7
16 = G(4) = 16
6 ≤ G(5) ≤ 17
9 ≤ G(6) ≤ 24
8 ≤ G(7) ≤ 33
32 ≤ G(8) ≤ 42
13 ≤ G(9) ≤ 50
12 ≤ G(10) ≤ 59
12 ≤ G(11) ≤ 67
16 ≤ G(12) ≤ 76
14 ≤ G(13) ≤ 84
15 ≤ G(14) ≤ 92
16 ≤ G(15) ≤ 100
64 ≤ G(16) ≤ 109
18 ≤ G(17) ≤ 117
27 ≤ G(18) ≤ 125
20 ≤ G(19) ≤ 134
25 ≤ G(20) ≤ 142

The number G(k) is greater than or equal to

2^{r+2}	if k = 2^{r} with r ≥ 2, or k = 3 × 2^{r};
p^{r+1}	if p is a prime greater than 2 and k = p^{r}(p − 1);
(p^{r+1} − 1)/2	if p is a prime greater than 2 and k = p^{r}(p − 1)/2;
k + 1	for all integers k greater than 1.

In the absence of congruence restrictions, a density argument suggests that G(k) should equal k + 1.

=== Upper bounds for G(k) ===
G(3) is at least 4 (since cubes are congruent to 0, 1 or −1 mod 9); for numbers less than 1.3×10^{9}, 1290740 is the last to require 6 cubes, and the number of numbers between N and 2N requiring 5 cubes drops off with increasing N at sufficient speed to have people believe that G(3) = 4; the largest number now known not to be a sum of 4 cubes is 7373170279850, and the authors give reasonable arguments there that this may be the largest possible. The upper bound G(3) ≤ 7 is due to Linnik in 1943. All nonnegative integers require at most 9 cubes (g(3) = 9), but the largest integer requiring 9 cubes is 239 and requiring 8 cubes is 454 (sequence A018889 in the OEIS). The largest integers requiring 7, 6 and 5 cubes are conjectured to be 8042, 1290740 and 7373170279850, respectively, hence, the upper bound G(3) ≤ 7.

13792 is the largest number to require 17 fourth powers (Deshouillers, Hennecart and Landreau showed in 2000 that every number between 13793 and 10^{245} required at most 16, and Kawada, Wooley and Deshouillers extended Davenport's 1939 result to show that every number above 10^{220} required at most 16). Numbers of the form 31·16^{n} always require 16 fourth powers.

68578904422 is the last known number that requires 9 fifth powers (Integer sequence S001057, Tony D. Noe, Jul 04 2017), 617597724 is the last number less than 1.3×10^{9} that requires 10 fifth powers, and 51033617 is the last number less than 1.3×10^{9} that requires 11.

The upper bounds on the right for 5 ≤ k ≤ 20 are due to Vaughan and Wooley.

Using his improved Hardy–Ramanujan–Littlewood method, I. M. Vinogradov published numerous refinements leading to

$$G(k) \le k(3\log k + 11)$$

in 1947 and, ultimately,

$$G(k) \le k(2\log k + 2\log\log k + C\log\log\log k)$$

for an unspecified constant C and sufficiently large k in 1959.

Applying his p-adic form of the Hardy–Ramanujan–Littlewood–Vinogradov method to estimating trigonometric sums, in which the summation is taken over numbers with small prime divisors, Anatolii Alexeevitch Karatsuba obtained in 1985 a new estimate, for $k \ge 400$:

$$G(k) \le k(2\log k + 2\log\log k + 12).$$

Further refinements were obtained by Vaughan in 1989.

Wooley then established that for some constant C,

$$G(k) \le k(\log k + \log\log k + C).$$

Vaughan and Wooley's survey article from 2002 was comprehensive at the time.

== See also ==
- Centered polygonal number theorem
- Fermat polygonal number theorem, that every positive integer is a sum of at most n of the n-gonal numbers
- Jacobi's four-square theorem, provides the number of ways a positive integer can be represented as the sum of 4 squares
- Pollock's conjectures
- Subset sum problem, an algorithmic problem that can be used to find the shortest representation of a given number as a sum of powers
- Sums of four cubes problem, discusses whether every integer is the sum of four cubes of integers
- Sums of three cubes, discusses what numbers are the sum of three not necessarily positive cubes
- Waring–Goldbach problem, the problem of representing numbers as sums of powers of primes
