= Goldbach's weak conjecture =

Conjecture about prime numbers, proof under review

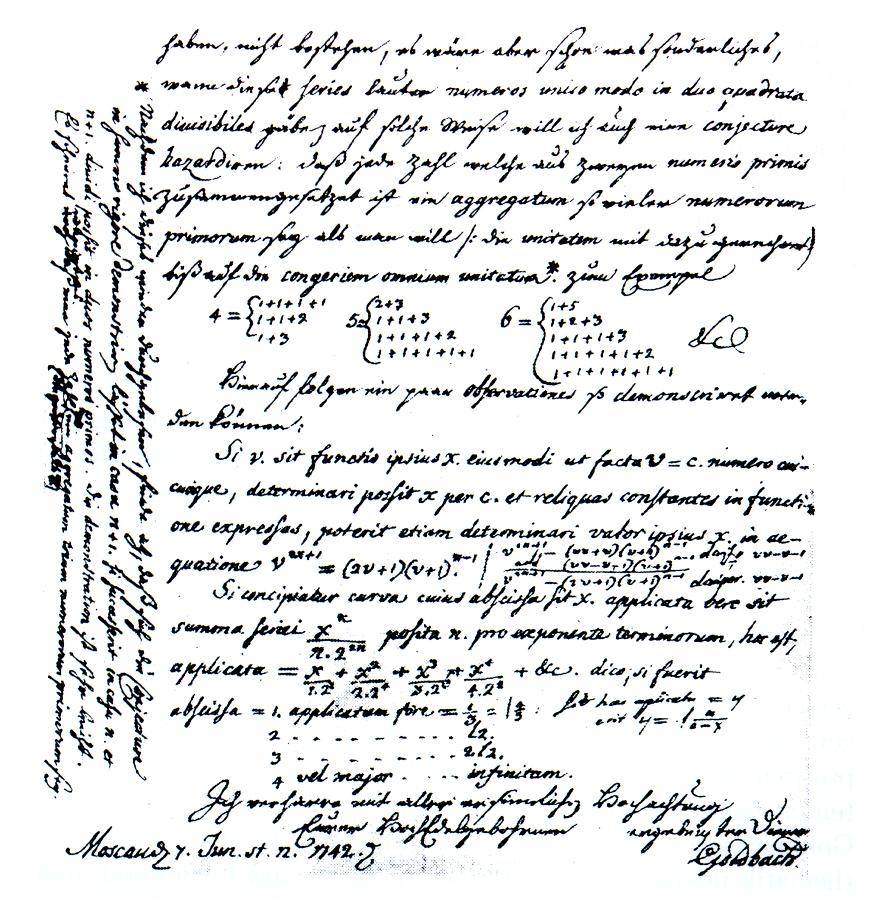
- Letter from Goldbach to Euler dated on 7 June 1742 (Latin-German)
- Field: Number theory
- Conjectured by: Christian Goldbach
- Conjectured in: 1742
- First proof by: Harald Helfgott
- First proof in: 2013
- Implied by: Goldbach's conjecture

In number theory, Goldbach's weak conjecture, also known as the odd Goldbach conjecture, the ternary Goldbach problem, or the 3-primes problem, is the proposition that every odd number greater than 5 can be expressed as the sum of three (not necessarily distinct) primes.

This conjecture is called "weak" because it is implied by Goldbach's strong conjecture concerning sums of two primes: indeed, if every even number greater than 4 is the sum of two odd primes, adding 3 to each even number greater than 4 will produce the odd numbers greater than 7 (and 7 itself is equal to 2 + 2 + 3). However, you cannot work backward to prove the strong conjecture from the weak one.

In 2013, Harald Helfgott proved Goldbach's weak conjecture, establishing that every odd integer greater than 5 is the sum of three primes. The proof is accepted by the mathematical community. A manuscript containing the complete proof was accepted for publication in the Annals of Mathematics Studies series in 2015, although Helfgott subsequently undertook extensive revisions and further refereeing before publication. Thus, while the revised monograph has remained in preparation, the conjecture is considered a proven theorem.

Some state the conjecture as

Every odd number greater than 7 can be expressed as the sum of three odd primes.

This version excludes 7 = 2 + 2 + 3, as 7 requires the even prime 2. On odd numbers larger than 7 it is slightly stronger as it also excludes sums like 17 = 2 + 2 + 13, which are allowed in the other formulation. Helfgott's proof covers both versions of the conjecture. Like the other formulation, this one also immediately follows from Goldbach's strong conjecture.

== Origins ==
The conjecture originated in correspondence between Christian Goldbach and Leonhard Euler. One formulation of the strong Goldbach conjecture, equivalent to the more common one in terms of sums of two primes, is

Every integer greater than 5 can be written as the sum of three primes.

The weak conjecture is simply this statement restricted to the case where the integer is odd (and possibly with the added requirement that the three primes in the sum be odd).

== Timeline of results ==
In 1923, Hardy and Littlewood showed that, assuming the generalized Riemann hypothesis, the weak Goldbach then-conjecture is true for all sufficiently large odd numbers. In 1937, Ivan Matveevich Vinogradov eliminated the dependency on the generalised Riemann hypothesis and proved directly (see Vinogradov's theorem) that all sufficiently large odd numbers can be expressed as the sum of three primes. Vinogradov's original proof, as it used the ineffective Siegel–Walfisz theorem, did not give a bound for "sufficiently large"; his student K. Borozdkin (1956) derived that $e^{e^{16.038}}\approx3^{3^{15}}$ is large enough. The integer part of this number has 4,008,660 decimal digits, so checking every number under this figure would be completely infeasible.

In 1997, Deshouillers, Effinger, te Riele and Zinoviev published a result showing that the generalized Riemann hypothesis implies Goldbach's weak then-conjecture for all numbers. This result combines a general statement valid for numbers greater than 10^{20} with an extensive computer search of the small cases. Saouter also conducted a computer search covering the same cases at approximately the same time.

Olivier Ramaré in 1995 showed that every even number n ≥ 4 is in fact the sum of at most six primes, from which it follows that every odd number n ≥ 5 is the sum of at most seven primes. Leszek Kaniecki showed every odd integer is a sum of at most five primes, under the Riemann Hypothesis. In 2012, Terence Tao proved this without the Riemann Hypothesis; this improves both results.

In 2002, Liu Ming-Chit (University of Hong Kong) and Wang Tian-Ze lowered Borozdkin's threshold to approximately $n>e^{3100}\approx 2 \times 10^{1346}$. The exponent is still much too large to admit checking all smaller numbers by computer. (Computer searches have only reached as far as 10^{18} for the strong Goldbach conjecture, and not much further than that for the weak Goldbach conjecture.)

In 2012 and 2013, Peruvian mathematician Harald Helfgott released a pair of papers improving major and minor arc estimates, culminating in his proof of Goldbach's weak conjecture. Here, the major arcs $\mathfrak M$ is the union of intervals $\left (a/q-cr_0/qx,a/q+cr_0/qx\right )$ around the rationals $a/q,q<r_0$ where $c$ is a constant. Minor arcs $\mathfrak{m}$ are defined to be $\mathfrak{m}=(\mathbb R/\mathbb Z)\setminus\mathfrak{M}$.
