= Bob Vaughan =

British mathematician

Robert Charles Vaughan
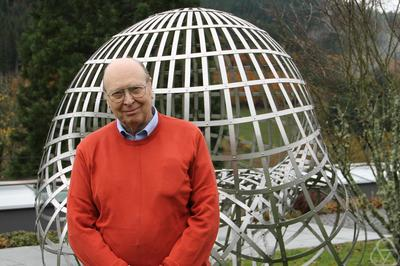
- R. C. Vaughan at Oberwolfach in 2019
- Born: March 24, 1945 (age 81)
- Education: University of London
- Known for: Analytic number theory Exponential sums Hardy–Littlewood circle method
- Awards: Berwick Prize (1979); Fellow of the Royal Society
- Scientific career
- Fields: Mathematician
- Workplaces: Penn State; Imperial College
- Doctoral advisor: Theodor Estermann
- Doctoral students: Trevor Wooley

Robert Charles Vaughan (born 24 March 1945) is a British mathematician, working in the field of analytic number theory.

== Life ==
Vaughan was born 24 March 1945. He read mathematics at University College London, earning a bachelor's degree with second class honours in 1966. He completed his PhD in 1970 at the University of London under supervision of Theodor Estermann. He supervised Trevor Wooley's PhD.

After postdoctoral research at the University of Nottingham and University of Sheffield, he became a lecturer in 1972 at Imperial College London. He was promoted to reader in 1976 and professor in 1980, and headed the Pure Mathematics Section from 1988 to 1990. Since 1999, he has been Professor at Pennsylvania State University.

== Awards ==
Vaughan was a 1979 recipient of the Junior Berwick Prize.

Since 1990 Vaughan has been a Fellow of the Royal Society. In 2012, he became a fellow of the American Mathematical Society.

In 1990, he was given an honorary doctorate (D.Sc.) by the University of London.

== See also ==
- Vaughan's identity

== Writings ==
- The Hardy–Littlewood Method. Cambridge Tracts in Mathematics. Vol. 125 (2nd ed.). Cambridge University Press. 1997. ISBN 978-0-521-57347-4.
- Hugh L. Montgomery; Robert C. Vaughan (2007). Multiplicative number theory I. Classical theory. Cambridge tracts in advanced mathematics. Vol. 97. ISBN 978-0-521-84903-6.
