= Ivan Vinogradov =

Soviet mathematician (1891–1983)

- Иван Виноградов
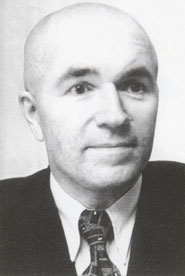
- Vinogradov in 1944
- Born: 14 September 1891; Milolyub village, Velikoluksky Uyezd, Pskov Governorate, Russian Empire
- Died: 20 March 1983 (aged 91); Moscow, Soviet Union
- Education: St. Petersburg State University
- Known for: Analytic number theory
- Awards: Fellow of the Royal Society
- Scientific career
- Fields: Mathematics
- Doctoral advisor: James Victor Uspensky

Ivan Matveevich Vinogradov ForMemRS (Russian: Ива́н Матве́евич Виногра́дов, IPA: [ɪˈvan mɐtˈvʲejɪvʲɪtɕ vʲɪnɐˈɡradəf]; 14 September 1891 – 20 March 1983) was a Soviet mathematician, who was one of the creators of modern analytic number theory, and also a dominant figure in mathematics in the USSR. He was born in the Velikiye Luki district, Pskov Oblast. He graduated from the University of St. Petersburg, where in 1920 he became a Professor. From 1934 he was a Director of the Steklov Institute of Mathematics, a position he held for the rest of his life, except for the five-year period (1941–1946) when the institute was directed by Academician Sergei Sobolev. In 1941 he was awarded the Stalin Prize. He was elected to the American Philosophical Society in 1942. In 1951 he became a foreign member of the Polish Academy of Sciences and Letters in Kraków.

== Mathematical contributions ==
In analytic number theory, Vinogradov's method refers to his main problem-solving technique, applied to central questions involving the estimation of exponential sums. In its most basic form, it is used to estimate sums over prime numbers, or Weyl sums. It is a reduction from a complicated sum to a number of smaller sums which are then simplified. The canonical form for prime number sums is

$$S=\sum_{p\le P}\exp(2\pi i f(p)).$$

With the help of this method, Vinogradov tackled questions such as the ternary Goldbach problem in 1937 (using Vinogradov's theorem), and the zero-free region for the Riemann zeta function. His own use of it was inimitable; in terms of later techniques, it is recognised as a prototype of the large sieve method in its application of bilinear forms, and also as an exploitation of combinatorial structure. In some cases his results resisted improvement for decades.

He also used this technique on the Dirichlet divisor problem, allowing him to estimate the number of integer points under an arbitrary curve. This was an improvement on the work of Georgy Voronoy.

In 1918 Vinogradov proved the Pólya–Vinogradov inequality for character sums.

== Personality and career ==
Vinogradov served as director of the Mathematical Institute for 49 years. For his long service he was twice awarded the order of The Hero of the Socialist Labour. The house where he was born was converted into his memorial – a unique honour among Russian mathematicians. As the head of a leading mathematical institute, Vinogradov enjoyed significant influence in the Academy of Sciences and was regarded as an informal leader of Soviet mathematicians, not always in a positive way: his anti-Semitic feelings led him to hinder the careers of many prominent Soviet mathematicians.

Although he was always faithful to the official line, he was never a member of the Communist Party and his overall mindset was nationalistic rather than communist. This can at least partly be attributed to his origins: his father was a priest of the Russian Orthodox Church. Vinogradov was enormously strong: in some recollections it is stated that he could lift a chair with a person sitting on it by holding the leg of the chair in his hands. He was never married and was very attached to his dacha in Abramtsevo, where he spent all his weekends and vacations (together with his sister Nadezhda, also unmarried) enjoying flower gardening. He had friendly relations with the president of the Russian Academy of Sciences Mstislav Keldysh and Mikhail Lavrentyev, both mathematicians whose careers started in his institute.

== Bibliography ==
- Selected Works, Berlin; New York: Springer-Verlag, 1985, ISBN 0-387-12788-7.
- Vinogradov, I. M. Elements of Number Theory. Mineola, NY: Dover Publications, 2003, ISBN 0-486-49530-2.
- Vinogradov, I. M. Method of Trigonometrical Sums in the Theory of Numbers. Mineola, NY: Dover Publications, 2004, ISBN 0-486-43878-3.
- Vinogradov I. M. (Ed.) Matematicheskaya entsiklopediya. Moscow: Sov. Entsiklopediya 1977. Now translated as the Encyclopaedia of Mathematics.
