= Elliott–Halberstam conjecture =

On the distribution of prime numbers in arithmetic progressions

In number theory, the Elliott–Halberstam conjecture is a conjecture about the distribution of prime numbers in arithmetic progressions. It has many applications in sieve theory. It is named for Peter D. T. A. Elliott and Heini Halberstam, who stated a specific version of the conjecture in 1968.

One version of the conjecture is as follows. Let $\pi(x)$, the prime-counting function, denote the number of primes less than or equal to $x$. If $q$ is a positive integer and $a$ is coprime to $q$, we let $\pi(x;q,a)$ denote the number of primes less than or equal to $x$ which are equal to $a$ modulo $q$. Dirichlet's theorem on primes in arithmetic progressions then tells us that

$$\pi(x;q,a) \sim  \frac{\pi(x)}{\varphi(q)}\ \ (x\rightarrow\infty)$$

where $\varphi$ is Euler's totient function. If we then define the error function

$$E(x;q) = \max_{\text{gcd}(a,q) = 1} \left|\pi(x;q,a) - \frac{\pi(x)}{\varphi(q)}\right|$$

where the max is taken over all $a$ coprime to $q$, then the Elliott–Halberstam conjecture is the assertion that for every $\theta < 1$ and $A > 0$ there exists a constant $C > 0$ such that

$$\sum_{1 \leq q \leq x^\theta} E(x;q) \leq \frac{C x}{\log^A x}$$

for all $x > 2$.

This conjecture was proven for all $\theta < 1/2$ by Enrico Bombieri and A. I. Vinogradov (the Bombieri–Vinogradov theorem, sometimes known simply as "Bombieri's theorem"); this result is already quite useful, being an averaged form of the generalized Riemann hypothesis. It is known that the conjecture fails at the endpoint $\theta = 1$. In 1986, Bombieri, Friedlander and Iwaniec generalized the Elliott-Halberstam conjecture, using Dirichlet convolution of arithmetic functions related to the von Mangoldt function.

The Elliott–Halberstam conjecture has several consequences. A striking one is the result announced by Dan Goldston, János Pintz, and Cem Yıldırım, which shows (assuming this conjecture) that there are infinitely many pairs of primes which differ by at most 16. In November 2013, James Maynard showed that subject to the Elliott–Halberstam conjecture, one can show the existence of infinitely many pairs of consecutive primes that differ by at most 12. In August 2014, Polymath group showed that subject to the generalized Elliott–Halberstam conjecture, one can show the existence of infinitely many pairs of consecutive primes that differ by at most 6. Without assuming any form of the conjecture, the lowest proven bound is 246.

== Original conjecture ==
The original Elliott-Halberstam conjecture is not clearly stated in their paper, but can be inferred there from (1) page 59 and the comment above the Theorem on page 62. It says that

$$\sum_{q\le x}\varphi(q)\max_{(h,q)=1} \left(\pi(x,q,h)-\frac{\operatorname{li}x}{\varphi(q)}\right)^2\ll\frac{x^2}{\log^Ax}$$

provided $X<x(\log x)^{-A-1}$, where $\operatorname{li} x$ denotes the logarithmic integral and $\varphi$ denotes Euler's totient function.

== See also ==
- Barban–Davenport–Halberstam theorem
- Sexy prime
- Siegel–Walfisz theorem
