= Titchmarsh =

Titchmarsh may refer to:

- Titchmarsh, Northamptonshire, a village in England
- Alan Titchmarsh (born 1949), English celebrity gardener, writer and broadcaster
  - The Alan Titchmarsh Show
- Charles Titchmarsh (1881–1930), English cricketer
- Edward Charles Titchmarsh (1899–1963), English mathematician
  - Titchmarsh theorem (disambiguation)
  - Titchmarsh convolution theorem
  - Brun–Titchmarsh theorem
- Valentine Titchmarsh (1853–1907), English cricketer and cricket umpire
