= Richert =

Richert is a surname. Notable people with the surname include:

- Carole Richert (born 1967), French actress
- Hans-Egon Richert (1924-1993), German mathematician
- Hedda Richert (1860–1929), Swedish writer and photographer
- Johan Gabriel Richert (1784-1864), Swedish jurist and politician
- Johann-Georg Richert (1890–1946), German officer executed for war crimes
- Nate Richert (born 1978), American actor and musician
- Pete Richert (born 1939), American baseball player
- Philippe Richert (born 1953), French politician, member of the Senate of France
- Teddy Richert (born 1974), French football player
- William Richert (1942–2022), American film director, producer, screenwriter and actor

== See also ==
- Jurkat–Richert theorem
