= Rogers sieving theorem =

Mathematical statement

The Rogers theorem on excluding congruence classes is an elementary result of C. A. Rogers in number theory from the 1960s, that for many years had the status of a folk theorem not well-documented in published literature. After more than half a century, its value as a principle in contemporary sieve theory received recognition.

== Background ==
Arithmetic progressions of integers are sets of the form a + nd, where n is any integer, and a (the offset) and d (the difference) are fixed. They can be intersected: the result may be empty; for example, the even numbers and odd numbers are disjoint. Otherwise, if two progressions have a number in common, then there will be an arithmetic progression in common, with a difference that is the least common multiple (LCM) m of the differences in the two progressions. That means that the intersection can be read as a question on integers modulo m.

The intersection of n progressions with differences d_{1}, d_{2}, ..., d_{n} is easiest to understand when the LCM m of the d_{i} is their product, or equivalently d_{i} and d_{j} have no common factor when i ≠ j. In that case the Chinese remainder theorem implies that congruences modulo m are the same as simultaneous congruences modulo all the d_{i}: the residue numeral system principle. The intersection will be a single progression with difference m.

== Sieving ==
The interest in sieve theory is in simultaneously excluding congruence classes for a number of moduli d_{i}. In Boolean algebra terms, one intersects a number of sets of congruence classes defined by complementation. The underlying problem is to understand cases when the Chinese remainder theorem does not apply, because the d_{i} are not pairwise coprime. The use of disjunctive normal form is a standard technique for Boolean manipulations. It here allows one to see that the result, at the progression level, is the union of a number of progressions, those resulting from non-empty intersections. These correspond to "surviving" (non-sieved) residue classes modulo m, and there arises the question of how many there might be.

=== Case when d_{2} divides d_{1} ===
A simple situation occurs when d_{2} divides d_{1}, because then the residue class modulo d_{1} determines the residue class modulo d_{2}. The progressions P(1) given by r + kd_{1} and P(2) given by s + ld_{2} will have a non-empty intersection if and only if

r ≡ s (mod d_{2}),

in which case the condition modulo d_{2} is always satisfied. In other words, the intersection is P(1).

The smallest example not covered in this way, for the prime factors 2 and 3, is with d_{1} = 12 and d_{2} = 18. A numerical example is given by Das.

== Statement of the theorem ==
The result of Rogers states that number of surviving residue classes is bounded above by the number when the congruence conditions are t ≡ 0 (mod d_{i}) for all i. In other words, when the "simple situation" cannot exclude anything because 0 ≡ 0 is automatic, the surviving classes are at a maximum.

It is possible to count those classes, in the special case. In fact the system of congruences is then equivalent to a system where the d_{i} are replaced by the powers of primes in the prime factorisation of the LCM m; in this case, the Chinese remainder theorem applies.

The original statement by Rogers, as modified by Heini Halberstam and Klaus Roth in their 1966 book Sequences, concerned minimising the natural density of the union of sets of progressions, when the offsets are varied. The minimum is attained for the offsets all set to 0. This approach looks at the complemented situation: the minimum union corresponds to the maximum non-sieved set.
