= Alina Carmen Cojocaru =

Romanian mathematician

- [aˈlina ˈkarmen koʒoˈkaru]
- Education: Queen's University Kingston, Ontario 2002 (Ph.D)
- Occupations: Mathematician, Professor, Researcher
- Employer(s): University of Illinois Chicago, Institute of Mathematics of the Romanian Academy
- Known for: Research on elliptic curves, arithmetic geometry, and sieve theory
- Notable work: Number theory

Alina Carmen Cojocaru (Romanian pronunciation: [aˈlina ˈkarmen koʒoˈkaru]) is a Romanian mathematician who works in number theory and is known for her research on elliptic curves, arithmetic geometry, and sieve theory. She is a professor of mathematics at the University of Illinois at Chicago and a researcher in the Institute of Mathematics of the Romanian Academy.

Cojocaru earned her Ph.D. from Queen's University in Kingston, Ontario, in 2002. Her dissertation, Cyclicity of Elliptic Curves Modulo p, was jointly supervised by M. Ram Murty and Ernst Kani.

Cojocaru was elected to be an American Mathematical Society (AMS) Council member at large from February 1, 2023, to January 31, 2024.

== Books ==
Cojocaru is an author of the book

- An Introduction to Sieve Methods and their Applications (with M. Ram Murty, London Mathematical Society Student Texts 66, Cambridge University Press, 2006).

She is also an editor of

- Women in Numbers: Research Directions in Number Theory (with Kristin Lauter, Rachel Justine Pries, and Renate Scheidler, Fields Institute Communications 60, American Mathematical Society, 2011).
- Scholar: A Scientific Celebration Highlighting Open Lines of Arithmetic Research: Conference in Honour of M. Ram Murty's Mathematical Legacy on His 60th Birthday (with C. David and F. Pappalardi, Contemporary Mathematics 655, American Mathematical Society, 2016)

== Selected publications ==
- Cojocaru, Alina Carmen; Murty, M. Ram (2004), "Cyclicity of elliptic curves modulo and elliptic curve analogues of Linnik's problem". Math. Ann. 330, no. 3, 601–625. MR 2099195.
- Cojocaru, Alina Carmen (2005), "On the surjectivity of the Galois representations associated to non-CM elliptic curves. With an appendix by Ernst Kani". Canad. Math. Bull. 48, no. 1, 16–31. MR 2118760.
- Cojocaru, Alina Carmen; Hall, Chris (2005). "Uniform results for Serre's theorem for elliptic curves". Int. Math. Res. Not., no. 50, 3065–3080. MR 2189500.
