= M. Ram Murty =

Indo-Canadian mathematician (born 1953)

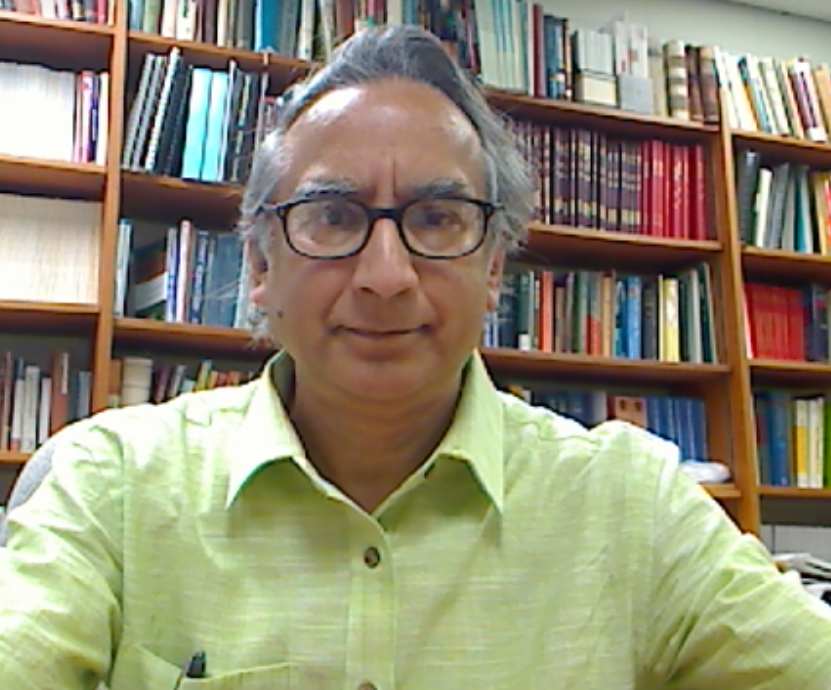
- Born: 16 October 1953 (age 73); Guntur, India
- Education: Carleton University; Massachusetts Institute of Technology
- Awards: Coxeter–James Prize (1988)
- Scientific career
- Fields: Mathematics
- Workplaces: McGill University; Queen's University
- Doctoral advisor: Harold Stark; Dorian M. Goldfeld
- Doctoral students: Alina Carmen Cojocaru; Chantal David; Hector Pasten

Maruti Ram Pedaprolu Murty, FRSC (born 16 October 1953) is an Indo-Canadian mathematician at Queen's University, where he holds a Queen's Research Chair in mathematics.

== Biography ==
M. Ram Murty is the brother of mathematician V. Kumar Murty.

Murty graduated with a B.Sc. from Carleton University in 1976. He received his Ph.D. in 1980 from the Massachusetts Institute of Technology, supervised by Harold Stark and Dorian Goldfeld. He was on the faculty of McGill University from 1982 until 1996, when he joined Queen's University. Murty is also cross-appointed as a professor of philosophy at Queen's, specialising in Indian philosophy.

== Research ==
Specializing in number theory, Murty is a researcher in the areas of modular forms, elliptic curves, and sieve theory. HE has an H Index 33 on Google scholar as of November 2026.

== Awards ==
Murty received the Coxeter–James Prize in 1988. He was elected a Fellow of the Royal Society of Canada in 1990, was elected to the Indian National Science Academy (INSA) in 2008, and became a fellow of the American Mathematical Society in 2012. In 2024, he won the CRM-Fields-PIMS Prize.

== Selected publications ==
- Cojocaru, Alina Carmen; Murty, M. Ram (2006). An introduction to sieve methods and their applications. London Mathematical Society Student Texts. Vol. 66. Cambridge University Press. ISBN 0-521-84816-4. MR 2200366..
- Murty, M. Ram; Murty, V. Kumar (1991). "Mean values of derivatives of modular L-series". Annals of Mathematics. Second Series. 133 (3). Annals of Mathematics: 447–475. doi:10.2307/2944316. JSTOR 2944316. MR 1109350..
