= Max Deuring =

German mathematician (1907–1984)

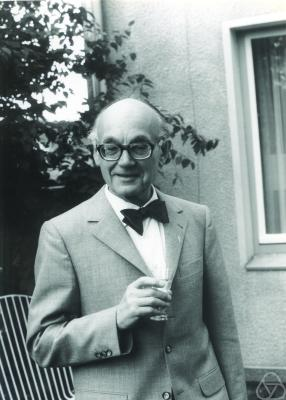
- Max Deuring in 1973
- Born: 9 December 1907; Göttingen, German Empire
- Died: 20 December 1984 (aged 77); Göttingen, Germany
- Education: University of Göttingen
- Scientific career
- Fields: Mathematics
- Workplaces: University of Göttingen
- Doctoral advisor: Emmy Noether
- Doctoral students: Karl-Peter Grotemeyer; Max Koecher; Hans-Egon Richert

Max Deuring (9 December 1907 – 20 December 1984) was a German mathematician. He is known for his work in arithmetic geometry, in particular on elliptic curves in characteristic p. He worked also in analytic number theory.

Deuring graduated from the University of Göttingen in 1930, then began working with Emmy Noether, who noted his mathematical acumen even as an undergraduate. When she was forced to leave Germany in 1933, she urged that the university offer her position to Deuring. In 1935 he published a report entitled Algebren ("Algebras"), which established his notability in the world of mathematics. He went on to serve as Ordinarius at Marburg and Hamburg, then took a position as ordentlicher Lehrstuhl at Göttingen, where he remained until his retirement.

Deuring was a fellow of the Leopoldina. His doctoral students include Max Koecher and Hans-Egon Richert.

== Selected works ==
- Algebren, Springer 1935
- Sinn und Bedeutung der mathematischen Erkenntnis, Felix Meiner, Hamburg 1949
- Klassenkörper der komplexen Multiplikation, Teubner 1958
- Lectures on the theory of algebraic functions of one variable, 1973 (from lectures at the Tata Institute, Mumbai)

== Sources ==
- Peter Roquette Über die algebraisch-zahlentheoretischen Arbeiten von Max Deuring, Jahresbericht DMV Vol.91, 1989, p. 109
- Martin Kneser Max Deuring, Jahresbericht DMV Vol.89, 1987, p. 135
- Martin Eichler Das wissenschaftliche Werk von Max Deuring, Acta Arithmetica Vol.47, 1986, p. 187

== See also ==
- Deuring–Heilbronn phenomenon
- Birch and Swinnerton-Dyer conjecture
- Supersingular elliptic curve
