= Peter D. T. A. Elliott =

American mathematician (born 1941)

Peter D. T. A. Elliott (born 1941) is an American mathematician, working in the field of number theory. He is one of the two mathematicians after whom the Elliott–Halberstam conjecture is named.

He obtained his PhD in 1969, from the University of Cambridge, under the supervision of Harold Davenport. He currently teaches at the University of Colorado at Boulder.

== Books ==
- Probabilistic Number Theory I - Mean Value Theorems, Spring-Verlag New York, 1979
- Probabilistic Number Theory II - Central Limit Theorems, Springer-Verlag New York, 1980
- Arithmetic Functions and Integer Products, Springer-Verlag New York, 1985
- Duality in Analytic Number Theory, Cambridge University Press, 1997
- Analytic and Elementary Number Theory - A Tribute to Mathematical Legend Paul Erdos, Krishnaswami Alladi, Andrew Granville, and G. Tenenbaum, Springer US, 1998
