= Acta Arithmetica =

- Discipline: number theory
- Language: English

Publication details
- History: 1935–present
- Publisher: Institute of Mathematics of the Polish Academy of Sciences

Standard abbreviations
- ISO 4: Acta Arith.

Indexing
- ISSN: 0065-1036 (print); 1730-6264 (web)

Links
- Journal homepage

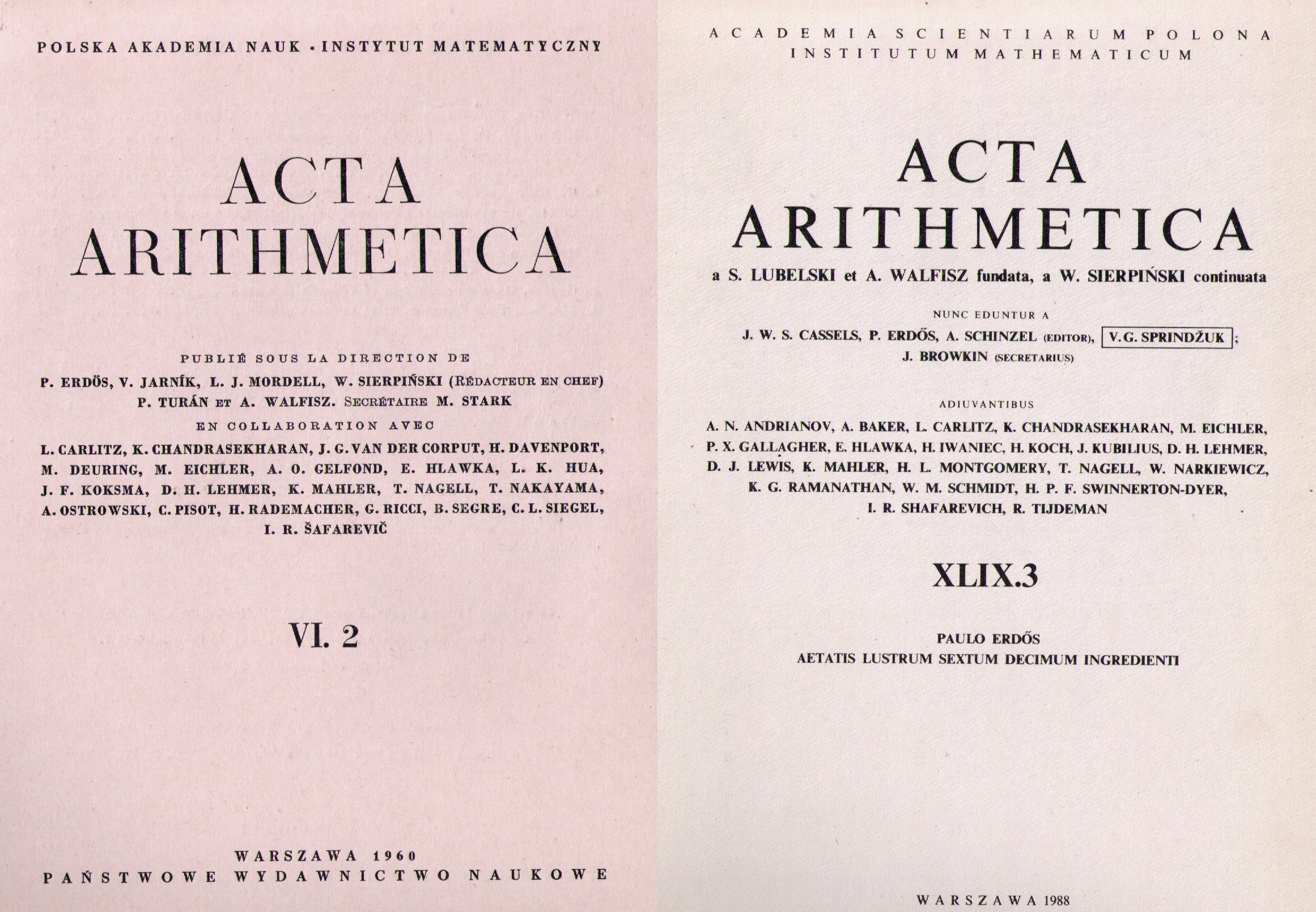
Acta Arithmetica

Acta Arithmetica is a scientific journal of mathematics publishing papers on number theory. It was established in 1935 by Salomon Lubelski and Arnold Walfisz. The journal is published by the Institute of Mathematics of the Polish Academy of Sciences.
