= Jurkat–Richert theorem =

Sieve theory

The Jurkat–Richert theorem is a mathematical theorem in sieve theory. It is a key ingredient in proofs of Chen's theorem on Goldbach's conjecture. It was proved in 1965 by Wolfgang B. Jurkat and Hans-Egon Richert.

== Statement of the theorem ==
This formulation is from Diamond & Halberstam. Other formulations are in Jurkat & Richert, Halberstam & Richert, and Nathanson.

Suppose A is a finite sequence of integers and P is a set of primes. Write A_{d} for the number of items in A that are divisible by d, and write P(z) for the product of the elements in P that are less than z. Write ω(d) for a multiplicative function such that ω(p)/p is approximately the proportion of elements of A divisible by p, write X for any convenient approximation to |A|, and write the remainder as

$$r_A (d) = \left| A_d \right| - \frac{\omega(d)}{d} X.$$

Write S(A,P,z) for the number of items in A that are relatively prime to P(z). Write

$$V(z) = \prod_{p \in P, p < z} \left( 1 - \frac{\omega(p)}{p} \right).$$

Write ν(m) for the number of distinct prime divisors of m. Write F_{1} and f_{1} for functions satisfying certain difference differential equations (see Diamond & Halberstam for the definition and properties).

We assume the dimension (sifting density) is 1: that is, there is a constant C such that for 2 ≤ z < w we have

$$\prod_{z \le p < w} \left( 1 - \frac{\omega(p)}{p} \right)^{-1} \le \left( \frac{\log w}{\log z} \right) \left( 1 + \frac{C}{\log z} \right).$$

(The book of Diamond & Halberstam extends the theorem to dimensions higher than 1.) Then the Jurkat–Richert theorem states that for any numbers y and z with 2 ≤ z ≤ y ≤ X we have

$$S(A,P,z) \le XV(z) \left( F_1 \left(\frac{\log y}{\log z} \right) + O\left(\frac{(\log \log y)^{3/4}}{(\log y)^{1/4}}\right) \right) + \sum_{m|P(z), m < y} 4^{\nu(m)} \left| r_A(m) \right|$$

and

$$S(A,P,z) \ge XV(z) \left( f_1 \left(\frac{\log y}{\log z} \right) - O\left(\frac{(\log \log y)^{3/4}}{(\log y)^{1/4}}\right) \right) - \sum_{m|P(z), m < y} 4^{\nu(m)} \left| r_A(m) \right|.$$
