= Arnold Walfisz =

Jewish-Polish mathematician

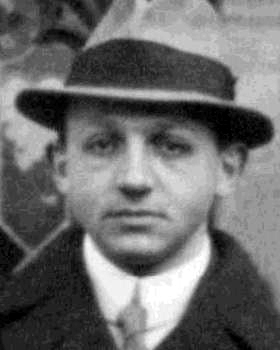
- 1920 at Göttingen
- Born: 2 July 1892; Warsaw, Congress Poland, Russian Empire
- Died: 29 May 1962 (aged 69); Tbilisi, Georgian SSR, Soviet Union
- Education: University of Göttingen
- Known for: Siegel–Walfisz theorem
- Scientific career
- Fields: Mathematics
- Workplaces: Tbilisi State University
- Doctoral advisor: Edmund Landau

Arnold Walfisz (2 July 1892 – 29 May 1962) was a Polish mathematician working in analytic number theory.

== Life ==
Walfisz was born in 1892 in a Polish-Jewish family. After the Abitur in Warsaw, Poland, he studied (1909−14 and 1918−21) in Germany at Munich, Berlin, Heidelberg and Göttingen. Edmund Landau was his doctoral-thesis supervisor at the University of Göttingen. Walfisz lived in Wiesbaden from 1922 through 1927, then he returned to Warsaw, worked at an insurance company and at the mathematical institute of the University of Warsaw obtaining his habilitation in 1930. In 1935, together with Salomon Lubelski, he founded the mathematical journal Acta Arithmetica. In 1936, Walfisz became professor at the University of Tbilisi in Soviet Georgia. He wrote approximately 100 mathematical articles and three books.

== Work ==
By using a theorem by Carl Ludwig Siegel providing an upper bound for the real zeros (see Siegel zero) of Dirichlet L-functions formed with real non-principal characters, Walfisz obtained the Siegel–Walfisz theorem, from which the prime number theorem for arithmetic progressions can be deduced.

By using estimates on exponential sums due to I. M. Vinogradov and N.M. Korobov , Walfisz obtained the currently best O-estimates for the remainder terms of the summatory functions of both the sum-of-divisors function $\sigma$ and the Euler function $\phi$ (in: "Weylsche Exponentialsummen in der neueren Zahlentheorie", see below).

== Works ==
- Pell's equation (in Russian), Tbilisi, 1952
- Gitterpunkte in mehrdimensionalen Kugeln [Lattice points in multi-dimensional spheres], Panstwowe Wydawnictwo Naukowe, Monografi Matematyczne, vol. 33. Warszawa, 1957, online
- Weylsche Exponentialsummen in der neueren Zahlentheorie [Weyl exponential sums in the newer number theory], VEB Deutscher Verlag der Wissenschaften, Berlin, 1963.
