= Large sieve =

Math method

The large sieve is a method (or family of methods and related ideas) in analytic number theory. It is a type of sieve where up to half of all residue classes of numbers are removed, as opposed to small sieves such as the Selberg sieve wherein only a few residue classes are removed. The method has been further heightened by the larger sieve which removes arbitrarily many residue classes.

== Name ==
Its name comes from its original application: given a set $S \subset \{ 1,\ldots,N \}$ such that the elements of $S$ are forbidden to lie in a set $A_p\subset \Z/p\Z$ modulo every prime $p$, how large can $S$ be? Here $A_p$ is thought of as being large, i.e., at least as large as a constant times $p$; if this is not the case, one speaks of a small sieve.

== History ==
The early history of the large sieve traces back to work of Yu. B. Linnik, in 1941, working on the problem of the least quadratic non-residue. Subsequently Alfréd Rényi worked on it, using probability methods. It was only two decades later, after quite a number of contributions by others, that the large sieve was formulated in a way that was more definitive. This happened in the early 1960s, in independent work of Klaus Roth and Enrico Bombieri. It is also around that time that the connection with the duality principle became better understood. In the mid-1960s, the Bombieri–Vinogradov theorem was proved as a major application of large sieves using estimations of mean values of Dirichlet characters. In the late 1960s and early 1970s, many of the key ingredients and estimates were simplified by Patrick X. Gallagher.

== Development ==
Large-sieve methods have been developed enough that they are applicable to small-sieve situations as well. Something is commonly seen as related to the large sieve not necessarily in terms of whether it is related to the kind of situation outlined above, but, rather, if it involves one of the two methods of proof traditionally used to yield a large-sieve result:

=== Approximate Plancherel inequality ===
If a set $S$ is ill-distributed modulo $p$ (by virtue, for example, of being excluded from the congruence classes $A_p$) then the Fourier coefficients $\widehat{f_p}(a)$ of the characteristic function $f_p$ of the set $S\bmod p$ are in average large. These coefficients can be lifted to values $\widehat{f}(a/p)$ of the Fourier transform $\widehat{f}$ of the characteristic function $f$ of the set $S$, that is,
$$\widehat{f}(a/p)=\widehat{f_p}(a).$$

Bounding derivatives shows see that $\widehat{f}(x)$ must be large, on average, for all $x$ near rational numbers of the form $a/p$. Large here means "a relatively large constant times $|S|$". Since
$$|f|_2 = \sqrt{|S|},$$
there is a contradiction with the Plancherel identity
$$|\widehat{f}|_2=|f|_2$$
unless $|S|$ is small. (In practice, to optimise bounds, people nowadays modify the Plancherel identity into an equality rather than bound derivatives as above.)

=== Duality principle ===
One can prove a strong large-sieve result easily by noting the following basic fact from functional analysis: the norm of a linear operator (i.e.,
$$\sup_v |Av|_W/|v|_V, \,$$

where $A$ is an operator from a linear space $V$ to a linear space $W$) equals the norm of its adjoint i.e.,
$$\sup_w |A^* w|^*_V/|w|^*_W.$$

This principle itself has come to acquire the name "large sieve" in some of the mathematical literature.

It is also possible to derive the large sieve from majorants in the style of Selberg (see Selberg, Collected Works, vol II, Lectures on sieves).

== See also ==
- Bombieri–Vinogradov theorem
- Larger sieve
