= Patrick X. Gallagher =

American mathematician (1935–2019)

- Born: January 2, 1935; Elizabeth, New Jersey, US
- Died: March 30, 2019 (aged 84)
- Education: Harvard University; Princeton University
- Known for: large sieve larger sieve
- Awards: Columbia University Presidential Teaching Award (2005)
- Scientific career
- Fields: Mathematics
- Workplaces: Columbia University; Barnard College; Institute for Advanced Study; Massachusetts Institute of Technology
- Doctoral advisor: Donald C. Spencer
- Doctoral students: Dorian M. Goldfeld

Patrick Ximenes Gallagher (January 2, 1935 – March 30, 2019) was an American mathematician who pioneered large sieve theory and invented the larger sieve.

== Biography ==
=== Early life ===
Patrick Ximenes Gallagher was born on January 2, 1935, in Elizabeth, New Jersey to school superintendent Ralph P. Gallagher and elementary school teacher Natalie Forcheimer Gallagher. Gallagher graduated from Bound Brook High School and received a scholarship from the Harvard Club of New Jersey to attend Harvard University.

=== Education ===
In 1956, Gallagher received a B.A. degree magna cum laude from Harvard University. At Harvard, he was a member of the Harvard Mathematics Club and Eliot House Mathematics-Physics Club and completed an undergraduate honors thesis entitled On a property of some entire functions. In 1959, Gallagher received a PhD from Princeton University with a doctoral dissertation entitled Metric Diophantine Approximation in One and Several Dimensions completed under the supervision of Donald C. Spencer.

=== Career ===
After receiving his doctoral degree, Gallagher served as an instructor at the Massachusetts Institute of Technology from 1959 to 1961. He spent one year living in the Latin Quarter of Paris before becoming an assistant professor at Columbia University in 1962. He moved from Columbia to become a member of the Institute for Advanced Study for the 1964-1965 academic year. From 1965 to 1972, he was an associate professor and then full professor at Barnard College.

In 1972, Gallagher moved back to Columbia University as a professor of mathematics. Gallagher received the Columbia University Presidential Teaching Award in 2005 and became director of undergraduate studies in the department of mathematics in 2013. He retired from Columbia in 2017 and was professor emeritus until his death in 2019.

== Research ==
In the 1960s and 1970s, Gallagher proved several results in large sieve methods in analytic number theory and simplified key ingredients used in the proof of the Bombieri–Vinogradov theorem. He also applied the large sieve to study the asymptotics of Galois groups of monic integral polynomials of bounded height, improving on results by van der Waerden.

In 1971, he invented the larger sieve.

== Family ==
Gallagher met his wife, Minh Chau Gallagher, while he was an instructor at MIT in 1960. Minh Chau was born in Hanoi to Roman Catholic parents. They had two sons together.
