= Titchmarsh theorem =

In mathematics, particularly in the area of Fourier analysis, the Titchmarsh theorem may refer to:

- The Titchmarsh convolution theorem
- The theorem relating real and imaginary parts of the boundary values of a H^{p} function in the upper half-plane with the Hilbert transform of an L^{p} function. See Hilbert transform#Titchmarsh's theorem.
