= Brun sieve =

Pre-generalisation of the fundamental lemma of sieve theory

In the field of number theory, the Brun sieve (also called Brun's pure sieve) is a technique for estimating the size of "sifted sets" of positive integers which satisfy a set of conditions which are expressed by congruences. It was developed by Viggo Brun in 1915 and later generalized to the fundamental lemma of sieve theory by others.

== Description ==
In terms of sieve theory the Brun sieve is of combinatorial type; that is, it derives from a careful use of the inclusion–exclusion principle.

Let $A$ be a finite set of positive integers. Let $P$ be some set of prime numbers. For each prime $p$ in $P$, let $A_p$ denote the set of elements of $A$ that are divisible by $p$. This notation can be extended to other integers $d$ that are products of distinct primes in $P$. In this case, define $A_d$ to be the intersection of the sets $A_p$ for the prime factors $p$ of $d$. Finally, define $A_1$ to be $A$ itself. Let $z$ be an arbitrary positive real number. The object of the sieve is to estimate:
$$S(A,P,z) = \biggl\vert A \setminus \bigcup_{p \in P\atop p \le z} A_p \biggr\vert ,$$

where the notation $|X|$ denotes the cardinality of a set $X$, which in this case is just its number of elements. Suppose in addition that $|A_d|$ may be estimated by
$$\left\vert A_d \right\vert = \frac{w(d)}{d} |A| + R_d,$$
where $w$ is some multiplicative function, and $R_d$ is some error function. Let
$$W(z) = \prod_{p \in P\atop p \le z} \left(1 - \frac{w(p)}{p} \right) .$$

=== Brun's pure sieve ===
This formulation is from Cojocaru & Murty, Theorem 6.1.2. With the notation as above, suppose that

- $| R_d | \leq w(d)$ for any squarefree $d$ composed of primes in $P$;
- $w(p) < C$ for all $p$ in $P$;
- There exist constants $C, D, E$ such that, for any positive real number $z$,
  $$\sum_{p \in P\atop p \le z} \frac{w(p)}{p} < D \log\log z + E.$$

Then
$$S(A,P,z) = X \cdot W(z) \cdot \left({1 + O\left((\log z)^{-b \log b}\right)}\right) + O\left(z^{b \log\log z}\right)$$

where $X$ is the cardinal of $A$, $b$ is any positive integer and the $O$ invokes big O notation. In particular, letting $x$ denote the maximum element in $A$, if $\log z< c\log x/\log\log x$ for a suitably small $c$, then
$$S(A,P,z) = X \cdot W(z) (1+o(1)) .$$

== Applications ==
- Brun's theorem: the sum of the reciprocals of the twin primes converges;
- Schnirelmann's theorem: every even number is a sum of at most $C$ primes (where $C$ can be taken to be 6);
- There are infinitely many pairs of integers differing by 2, where each of the member of the pair is the product of at most 9 primes;
- Every even number is the sum of two numbers each of which is the product of at most 9 primes.

The last two results were superseded by Chen's theorem, and the second by Goldbach's weak conjecture ($C=3$).
