= Askold Vinogradov =

Russian mathematician (1929–2005

Askold Ivanovich Vinogradov (Russian: Аско́льд Ива́нович Виногра́дов; 1929 – 31 December 2005) was a Russian mathematician who worked in analytic number theory. The Bombieri–Vinogradov theorem is partially named after him.
