= Bombieri–Vinogradov theorem =

Mathematical theorem

In mathematics, the Bombieri–Vinogradov theorem (sometimes simply called Bombieri's theorem) is a major result of analytic number theory, obtained in the mid-1960s, concerning the distribution of primes in arithmetic progressions, averaged over a range of moduli. The first result of this kind was obtained by Mark Barban in 1961 and the Bombieri–Vinogradov theorem is a refinement of Barban's result. The Bombieri–Vinogradov theorem is named after Enrico Bombieri and A. I. Vinogradov, who published on a related topic, the density hypothesis, in 1965.

This result is a major application of the large sieve method, which developed rapidly in the early 1960s, from its beginnings in work of Yuri Linnik two decades earlier. Besides Bombieri, Klaus Roth was working in this area. In the late 1960s and early 1970s, many of the key ingredients and estimates were simplified by Patrick X. Gallagher.

== Statement ==
Let $x$ and $Q$ be any two positive real numbers with

$$x^{1/2}\log^{-A}x \leq Q \leq x^{1/2}.$$

Then

$$\sum_{q\leq Q}\max_{y\le x}\max_{1\le a\le q\atop (a,q)=1}\left|\psi(y;q,a)-{y\over\varphi(q)}\right|=O\left(x^{1/2}Q(\log x)^5\right)\!.$$

Here $\varphi(q)$ is the Euler totient function, which is the number of summands for the modulus q, and

$$\psi(x;q,a)=\sum_{n\le x\atop n\equiv a\bmod q}\Lambda(n),$$

where $\Lambda$ denotes the von Mangoldt function.

A verbal description of this result is that it addresses the error term in the prime number theorem for arithmetic progressions, averaged over the moduli q up to Q. For a certain range of Q, which are around $\sqrt x$ if we neglect logarithmic factors, the error averaged is nearly as small as $\sqrt x$. This is not obvious, and without the averaging is about of the strength of the Generalized Riemann Hypothesis (GRH).

== See also ==
- Elliott–Halberstam conjecture (a generalization of Bombieri–Vinogradov)
- Vinogradov's theorem (named after Ivan Matveyevich Vinogradov)
- Siegel–Walfisz theorem
