= Friedlander–Iwaniec theorem =

Infinite prime numbers of the form a^2+b^4

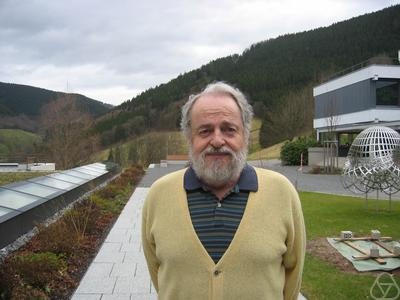
John Friedlander

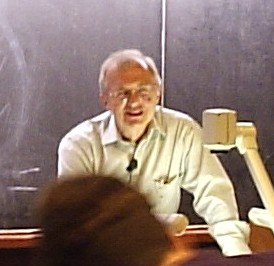
Henryk Iwaniec

In analytic number theory the Friedlander–Iwaniec theorem states that there are infinitely many prime numbers of the form $a^2 + b^4$. The first few such primes are

2, 5, 17, 37, 41, 97, 101, 137, 181, 197, 241, 257, 277, 281, 337, 401, 457, 577, 617, 641, 661, 677, 757, 769, 821, 857, 881, 977, … (sequence A028916 in the OEIS).

The difficulty in this statement lies in the very sparse nature of this sequence: the number of integers of the form $a^2+b^4$ less than $X$ is roughly of the order $X^{3/4}$.

== History ==
The theorem was proved in 1997 by John Friedlander and Henryk Iwaniec. Iwaniec was awarded the 2001 Ostrowski Prize in part for his contributions to this work.

== Refinements ==
The theorem was refined by D.R. Heath-Brown and Xiannan Li in 2017. In particular, they proved that the polynomial $a^2 + b^4$ represents infinitely many primes when the variable $b$ is also required to be prime. Namely, if $f(n)$ is the prime numbers less than $n$ in the form $a^2 + b^4,$ then

$f(n) \sim v \frac{x^{3/4}}{\log{x}}$

where

$v=2 \sqrt{\pi} \frac{\Gamma(5/4)}{\Gamma(7/4)} \prod_{p \equiv 1\bmod 4} \frac{p-2}{p-1} \prod_{p \equiv 3\bmod 4} \frac{p}{p-1}.$

In 2024, a paper by Stanley Yao Xiao generalized the Friedlander—Iwaniec theorem and Heath-Brown—Li theorems to general binary quadratic forms, including indefinite forms. In particular one has, for $f(x,y) \in \mathbb{Z}[x,y]$ a positive definite binary quadratic form satisfying $f(x,1) \not \equiv x(x+1) \pmod{2}$, one has, for $\lambda$ the prime indicator function and

$\mathfrak{S}_f = \operatorname{Area} \{(x,y) \in \mathbb{R}^2 : f(x,y^2) \leq 1\}$

and

$\nu_f = \prod_{p \nmid \Delta(f)} \left(1 - \frac{\rho_f(p)}{p} \right) \left(1 - \frac{1}{p} \right)^{-1} \prod_{p | \Delta(f)} \left(1 - \frac{1}{p} \right)^{-1},$

with $\rho_f(m) = \# \{x \pmod{m} : f(x,1) \equiv 0 \pmod{m}\}$, the asymptotic formula:

$\sum_{\begin{array}{c} m, \ell \in \mathbb{Z}\\ f(m,\ell^2) \leq X \end{array} } \lambda(f(m, \ell^2)) = \frac{\nu_f \mathfrak{S}_f X^{3/4}}{\log X}\left(1 + O \left(\frac{\log \log X}{\log X} \right) \right)$

Here $\Delta(f)$ is the discriminant of the quadratic form $f$.

For indefinite, irreducible forms $f(x,y) \in \mathbb{Z}[x,y]$ satisfying $f(x,1) \not \equiv x(x+1) \pmod{2}$, put

$\mathfrak{S}_f = \lim_{X \rightarrow \infty} \frac{\operatorname{Area}\{(x,y) \in \mathbb{R}^2 : 0< f(x,y^2) \leq X, 0 < y < X^{1/4} }{X^{3/4}}.$

Then one has the asymptotic formula

$\sum_{\begin{array}{c} m, \ell \in \mathbb{Z}\\ f(m,\ell^2) \leq X \\ 0 < \ell \leq X^{3/4} \end{array} } \lambda (f(m, \ell^2)) = \frac{\nu_f \mathfrak{S}_f X^{3/4}}{\log X} \left(1 + O \left(\frac{\log \log X}{\log X} \right) \right).$

== Special case ==
When b = 1, the Friedlander–Iwaniec primes have the form $a^2+1$, forming the set

2, 5, 17, 37, 101, 197, 257, 401, 577, 677, 1297, 1601, 2917, 3137, 4357, 5477, 7057, 8101, 8837, 12101, 13457, 14401, 15377, … (sequence A002496 in the OEIS).

It is conjectured (one of Landau's problems) that this set is infinite. However, this is not implied by the Friedlander–Iwaniec theorem.
