= Ostrowski Prize =

Mathematics award

The Ostrowski Prize is a mathematics award given biennially for outstanding research accomplishments in mathematics and numerical analysis. Alexander Ostrowski, a longtime professor at the University of Basel, left his estate to the Ostrowski Foundation in order to establish the prize.

== Recipients ==
- 1989: Louis de Branges
- 1991: Jean Bourgain
- 1993: Miklós Laczkovich and Marina Ratner
- 1995: Andrew J. Wiles
- 1997: Yuri V. Nesterenko and Gilles I. Pisier
- 1999: Alexander A. Beilinson and Helmut H. Hofer
- 2001: Henryk Iwaniec, Peter Sarnak, and Richard L. Taylor
- 2003: Paul Seymour
- 2005: Ben Green and Terence Tao
- 2007: Oded Schramm
- 2009: Sorin Popa
- 2011: Ib Madsen, David Preiss, and Kannan Soundararajan
- 2013: Yitang Zhang
- 2015: Peter Scholze
- 2017: Akshay Venkatesh
- 2019: Assaf Naor
- 2021: Tim Austin
- 2023: Jacob Tsimerman
- 2025: Hong Wang

== See also ==
- List of mathematics awards
