= Hans-Egon Richert =

German mathematician

- Born: June 2, 1924; Hamburg, Germany
- Died: November 25, 1993 (aged 69); Blaustein, Germany
- Education: University of Hamburg
- Known for: additive number theory sieve theory Dirichlet divisor problem
- Scientific career
- Fields: Mathematics
- Workplaces: University of Göttingen; University of Marburg; University of Ulm
- Doctoral advisor: Max Deuring

Hans-Egon Richert (June 2, 1924 – November 25, 1993) was a German mathematician who worked primarily in analytic number theory. He is the author (with Heini Halberstam) of a definitive book on sieve theory.

== Life and education ==
Hans-Egon Richert was born in 1924 in Hamburg, Germany. He attended the University of Hamburg and received his Ph.D. under Max Deuring in 1950. He held a temporary chair at the University of Göttingen and then a newly created chair at the University of Marburg. In 1972 he moved to the University of Ulm, where he remained until his retirement in 1991. He died on November 25, 1993, in Blaustein, near Ulm, Germany.

== Work ==
Richert worked primarily in analytic number theory, and beginning around 1965 started a collaboration with Heini Halberstam and shifted his focus to sieve theory. For many years he was a chairman of the Analytic Number Theory meetings at the Mathematical Research Institute of Oberwolfach.

=== Analytic number theory ===
Richert made contributions to additive number theory, Dirichlet series, Riesz summability, the multiplicative analog of the Erdős–Fuchs theorem, estimates of the number of non-isomorphic abelian groups, and bounds for exponential sums. He proved the exponent 15/46 for the Dirichlet divisor problem, a record that stood for many years.

=== Sieve methods ===
One of Richert's notable results was the Jurkat–Richert theorem, joint work with Wolfgang B. Jurkat that improved the Selberg sieve and is used in the proof of Chen's theorem. Richert also produced a "readable form" of Chen's theorem (it is covered in the last chapter of Sieve Methods).

Halberstam and Richert's book Sieve Methods was the first exhaustive account of the subject. In reviewing the book in 1976, Hugh Montgomery wrote "In the past, researchers have generally derived the sieve bounds required for an application, but now workers will find that usually an appeal to an appropriate theorem of Sieve methods will suffice," and "For years to come, Sieve methods will be vital to those seeking to work in the subject, and also to those seeking to make applications."
