= Titchmarsh convolution theorem =

The Titchmarsh convolution theorem describes the properties of the support of the convolution of two functions. It was proven by Edward Charles Titchmarsh in 1926.

== Titchmarsh convolution theorem ==
If $\varphi(t)\,$ and $\psi(t)$ are integrable functions, such that

$$\varphi * \psi = \int_0^x \varphi(t)\psi(x-t)\,dt=0$$

almost everywhere in the interval $0<x<\kappa\,$, then there exist $\lambda\geq0$ and $\mu\geq0$ satisfying $\lambda+\mu\ge\kappa$ such that $\varphi(t)=0\,$ almost everywhere in $0<t<\lambda$ and $\psi(t)=0\,$ almost everywhere in $0<t<\mu.$

As a corollary, if the integral above is 0 for all $x>0,$ then either $\varphi\,$ or $\psi$ is almost everywhere 0 in the interval $[0,+\infty).$ Thus the convolution of two functions on $[0,+\infty)$ cannot be identically zero unless at least one of the two functions is identically zero.

As another corollary, if $\varphi * \psi (x) = 0$ for all $x\in [0, \kappa]$ and one of the function $\varphi$ or $\psi$ is almost everywhere not null in this interval, then the other function must be null almost everywhere in $[0,\kappa]$.

The theorem can be restated in the following form:

Let $\varphi, \psi\in L^1(\mathbb{R})$. Then $\inf\operatorname{supp} \varphi\ast \psi=\inf\operatorname{supp} \varphi+\inf\operatorname{supp} \psi$ if the left-hand side is finite. Similarly, $\sup\operatorname{supp} \varphi\ast\psi = \sup\operatorname{supp}\varphi + \sup\operatorname{supp} \psi$ if the right-hand side is finite.

Above, $\operatorname{supp}$ denotes the support of a function f (i.e., the closure of the complement of f^{−1}(0)) and $\inf$ and $\sup$ denote the infimum and supremum. This theorem essentially states that the well-known inclusion $\operatorname{supp}\varphi\ast \psi \subset \operatorname{supp}\varphi+\operatorname{supp}\psi$ is sharp at the boundary.

The higher-dimensional generalization in terms of the convex hull of the supports was proven by Jacques-Louis Lions in 1951:

If $\varphi, \psi\in\mathcal{E}'(\mathbb{R}^n)$, then $\operatorname{c.h.} \operatorname{supp} \varphi\ast \psi=\operatorname{c.h.} \operatorname{supp} \varphi+\operatorname{c.h.}\operatorname{supp} \psi$

Above, $\operatorname{c.h.}$ denotes the convex hull of the set and $\mathcal{E}' (\mathbb{R}^n)$ denotes the space of distributions with compact support.

The original proof by Titchmarsh uses complex-variable techniques, and is based on the Phragmén–Lindelöf principle, Jensen's inequality, Carleman's theorem, and Valiron's theorem. The theorem has since been proven several more times, typically using either real-variable or complex-variable methods. Gian-Carlo Rota has stated that no proof yet addresses the theorem's underlying combinatorial structure, which he believes is necessary for complete understanding.
