= Siegel–Walfisz theorem =

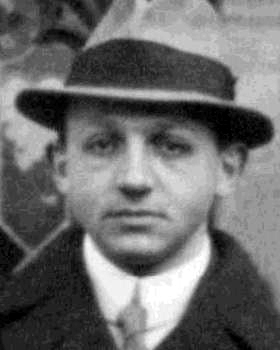
Mathematician Arnold Walfisz, 1920 at Göttingen.

In analytic number theory, the Siegel–Walfisz theorem was obtained by Arnold Walfisz as an application of a theorem by Carl Ludwig Siegel to primes in arithmetic progressions. It is a refinement both of the prime number theorem and of Dirichlet's theorem on primes in arithmetic progressions.

== Statement ==
Define

$$\psi(x;q,a) = \sum_{n\,\leq\,x \atop n\,\equiv\,a\!\pmod{\!q}}\Lambda(n),$$

where $\Lambda$ denotes the von Mangoldt function, and let $\varphi$ denote Euler's totient function.

Then the theorem states that given any real number N there exists a positive constant C_{N} depending only on N such that

$$\psi(x;q,a)=\frac{x}{\varphi(q)}+O\left(x\exp\left(-C_N(\log x)^\frac{1}{2}\right)\right),$$

whenever (a, q) = 1 and

$$q\le(\log x)^N.$$

== Remarks ==
The constant C_{N} is not effectively computable because Siegel's theorem is ineffective.

From the theorem we can deduce the following bound regarding the prime number theorem for arithmetic progressions: If, for (a, q) = 1, by $\pi(x;q,a)$ we denote the number of primes less than or equal to x which are congruent to a mod q, then

$$\pi(x;q,a) = \frac{{\rm Li}(x)}{\varphi(q)}+O\left(x\exp\left(-\frac{C_N}{2}(\log x)^\frac{1}{2}\right)\right),$$

where N, a, q, C_{N} and φ are as in the theorem, and Li denotes the logarithmic integral.

== See also ==
- Bombieri–Vinogradov theorem
