= Edward Charles Titchmarsh =

British mathematician

Professor Ted Titchmarsh
- Born: Edward Charles Titchmarsh; 1 June 1899; Newbury, Berkshire, England
- Died: 18 January 1963 (aged 63); Oxford, Oxfordshire, England
- Education: Balliol College, Oxford
- Known for: Brun–Titchmarsh theorem Titchmarsh convolution theorem Titchmarsh theorem (on the Hilbert transform); Titchmarsh–Kodaira formula
- Awards: De Morgan Medal (1953); Sylvester Medal (1955); Senior Berwick Prize (1956); Fellow of the Royal Society
- Scientific career
- Academic advisors: G. H. Hardy
- Doctoral students: Lionel Cooper; John Bryce McLeod; Frederick Valentine Atkinson

Edward Charles "Ted" Titchmarsh (June 1, 1899 – January 18, 1963) was a leading British mathematician.

== Education ==
Titchmarsh was educated at King Edward VII School (Sheffield) and Balliol College, Oxford, where he began his studies in October 1917.

== Career ==
Titchmarsh was known for work in analytic number theory, Fourier analysis and other parts of mathematical analysis. He wrote several classic books in these areas; his book on the Riemann zeta-function was reissued in a 1986 edition edited by Roger Heath-Brown.

Titchmarsh was Savilian Professor of Geometry at the University of Oxford from 1932 to 1963. He was a Plenary Speaker at the ICM in 1954 in Amsterdam.

He was on the governing body of Abingdon School from 1935-1947.

== Awards ==
- Fellow of the Royal Society, 1931
- De Morgan Medal, 1953
- Sylvester Medal, 1955
- Berwick Prize winner, 1956

== Publications ==
- The Zeta-Function of Riemann (1930);
- Introduction to the Theory of Fourier Integrals (1937) 2nd. edition(1939) 2nd. edition (1948);
- The Theory of Functions (1932);
- Mathematics for the General Reader (1948);
- The Theory of the Riemann Zeta-Function (1951); 2nd edition, revised by D. R. Heath-Brown (1986)
- Eigenfunction Expansions Associated with Second-order Differential Equations. Part I (1946) 2nd. edition (1962);
- Eigenfunction Expansions Associated with Second-order Differential Equations. Part II (1958);
