= John Friedlander =

Canadian mathematician

John Benjamin Friedlander
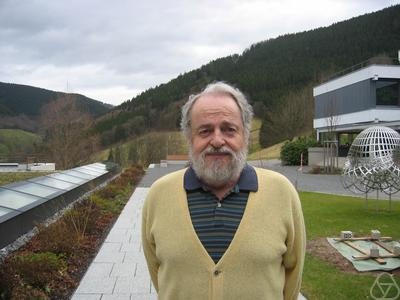
- Friedlander in 2008
- Citizenship: Canadian
- Education: University of Toronto, University of Waterloo, Pennsylvania State University
- Known for: Analytic number theory Bombieri–Friedlander–Iwaniec theorem
- Awards: Fellow of the Royal Society of Canada, Jeffery–Williams Prize, Fellow of American Mathematical Society, 2012
- Scientific career
- Fields: Mathematics
- Workplaces: Institute for Advanced Study; MIT; University of Toronto
- Doctoral advisor: Sarvadaman Chowla
- Doctoral students: Cem Yıldırım

John Friedlander FRSC is a Canadian mathematician specializing in analytic number theory. He received his B.Sc. from the University of Toronto in 1965, an M.A. from the University of Waterloo in 1966, and a Ph.D. from Pennsylvania State University in 1972. He was a lecturer at M.I.T. in 1974–1976, and has been on the faculty of the University of Toronto since 1977, where he served as Chair during 1987–1991. He has also spent several years at the Institute for Advanced Study. In addition to his individual work, he has been notable for his collaborations with other well-known number theorists, including Enrico Bombieri, William Duke, Andrew Granville, and especially Henryk Iwaniec.

In 1997, in joint work with Henryk Iwaniec, Friedlander proved that infinitely many prime numbers can be obtained as the sum of a square and fourth power: a^{2} + b^{4}. Friedlander and Iwaniec improved Enrico Bombieri's "asymptotic sieve" technique to construct their proof.

== Awards and honors ==
- In 1999, Friedlander received the Jeffery–Williams Prize.
- In 1988, Friedlander became a fellow of the Royal Society of Canada.
- In 2002, CRM-Fields-PIMS prize
- In 2012, he became a fellow of the American Mathematical Society.
- In 2017, he received the Joseph L. Doob prize, jointly with Henryk Iwaniec, for their book Opera de Cribro.

== Selected publications ==
- Friedlander, John; Iwaniec, Henryk (2010). Opera de Cribro. Providence: American Mathematical Society. ISBN 978-0-8218-4970-5.

== See also ==
- List of University of Waterloo people
