= Henryk Iwaniec =

Polish-American mathematician (born 1947)

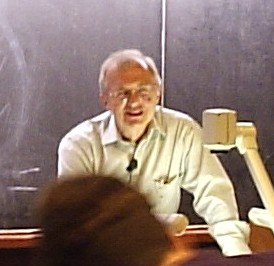
- Born: October 9, 1947 (age 79); Elbląg, Poland
- Citizenship: Poland, United States
- Education: University of Warsaw
- Known for: analytic number theory Friedlander–Iwaniec theorem automorphic forms Sieve theory
- Awards: Ostrowski Prize (2001); Cole Prize (2002); Steele Prize (2011); Shaw Prize (2015); Joseph L. Doob Prize (2017)
- Scientific career
- Fields: Mathematician
- Workplaces: Polish Academy of Sciences; Institute for Advanced Study; Rutgers University; University of Michigan
- Doctoral advisor: Andrzej Schinzel
- Doctoral students: Étienne Fouvry; Harald Helfgott

Henryk Iwaniec (born October 9, 1947) is a Polish-American mathematician and New Jersey Professor Emeritus of Mathematics at Rutgers University. He is a member of the American Academy of Arts and Sciences and the Polish Academy of Sciences. He has made important contributions to analytic and algebraic number theory as well as harmonic analysis. He is the recipient of Cole Prize (2002), Steele Prize (2011), and Shaw Prize (2015).

== Background and education ==
Iwaniec studied at the University of Warsaw, where he got his PhD in 1972 under Andrzej Schinzel. He then held positions at the Institute of Mathematics of the Polish Academy of Sciences until 1983 when he left Poland. He held visiting positions at the Institute for Advanced Study, University of Michigan, and University of Colorado Boulder before being appointed New Jersey Professor of Mathematics at Rutgers University in 1987. He is a citizen of both Poland and the United States.

He and mathematician Tadeusz Iwaniec are twin brothers.

== Work ==
Iwaniec studies both sieve methods and deep complex-analytic techniques, with an emphasis on the theory of automorphic forms and harmonic analysis.

In 1997, Iwaniec and John Friedlander proved that there are infinitely many prime numbers of the form a^{2} + b^{4}. Results of this strength had previously been seen as completely out of reach: sieve theory—used by Iwaniec and Friedlander in combination with other techniques—cannot usually distinguish between primes and products of two primes, say. He also showed that there are infinitely many numbers of the form $n^2+1$ with at most two prime factors.

In 2001, Iwaniec was awarded the seventh Ostrowski Prize. The prize citation read, in part, "Iwaniec's work is characterized by depth, profound understanding of the difficulties of a problem, and unsurpassed technique. He has made deep contributions to the field of analytic number theory, mainly in modular forms on GL(2) and sieve methods."

== Awards and honors ==
He became a fellow of the American Academy of Arts and Sciences in 1995. In 1996, Iwaniec received the Sierpiński Medal conferred jointly by the Polish Mathematical Society and the University of Warsaw. He was awarded the fourteenth Frank Nelson Cole Prize in Number Theory in 2002. In 2006, he became a member of the National Academy of Science. He received the Leroy P. Steele Prize for Mathematical Exposition in 2011. In 2012, he became a fellow of the American Mathematical Society. In 2015 he was awarded the Shaw Prize in Mathematics. In 2017, he was awarded the AMS Doob Prize (jointly with John Friedlander) for their book Opera de Cribro, which is about sieve theory.

== Publications ==
- Iwaniec, Henryk (1997). Topics in Classical Automorphic Forms. Providence: American Mathematical Society. ISBN 978-0-8218-0777-4.
- Iwaniec, Henryk (2002). Spectral Methods of Automorphic Forms (2nd ed.). Providence: American Mathematical Society. ISBN 978-0-8218-3160-1.
- Iwaniec, Henryk; Emmanuel Kowalski (2004). Analytic Number Theory. Providence: American Mathematical Society. ISBN 978-0-8218-3633-0.
- Iwaniec, Henryk; J. B. Friedlander; D. R. Heath-Brown; J. Kaczorowski (2006). Analytic Number Theory: Lectures Given at the C.I.M.E. Summer School Held in Cetraro, Italy, July 11–18, 2002. Berlin: Springer. ISBN 978-3-540-36363-7.
- Friedlander, John; Iwaniec, Henryk (2010). Opera de Cribro. Providence: American Mathematical Society. ISBN 978-0-8218-4970-5.
- Iwaniec, Henryk (2014). Lectures on the Riemann zeta function. Providence: American Mathematical Society. ISBN 978-1-4704-1851-9.

== See also ==
- List of Polish mathematicians
