= Selberg sieve =

Estimate size of sifted sets

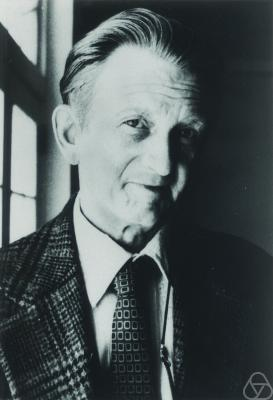
Atle Selberg

In number theory, the Selberg sieve is a technique for estimating the size of "sifted sets" of positive integers which satisfy a set of conditions which are expressed by congruences. It was developed by Atle Selberg in the 1940s.

== Description ==
In terms of sieve theory the Selberg sieve is of combinatorial type: that is, derives from a careful use of the inclusion–exclusion principle. Selberg replaced the values of the Möbius function which arise in this by a system of weights which are then optimised to fit the given problem. The result gives an upper bound for the size of the sifted set.

Let $A$ be a set of positive integers $\le x$ and let $P$ be a set of primes. Let $A_d$ denote the set of elements of $A$ divisible by $d$ when $d$ is a product of distinct primes from $P$. Further let $A_1$ denote $A$ itself. Let $z$ be a positive real number and $P(z)$ denote the product of the primes in $P$ which are $\le z$. The object of the sieve is to estimate

$$S(A,P,z) = \left\vert A \setminus \bigcup_{p \mid P(z)} A_p \right\vert .$$

We assume that |A_{d}| may be estimated by

$$\left\vert A_d \right\vert = \frac{1}{f(d)} X + R_d .$$

where f is a multiplicative function and X = |A|. Let the function g be obtained from f by Möbius inversion, that is

$$g(n) = \sum_{d \mid n} \mu(d) f(n/d)$$
$$f(n) = \sum_{d \mid n} g(d)$$

where μ is the Möbius function. Put

$$V(z) = \sum_{\begin{smallmatrix}d < z \\ d \mid P(z)\end{smallmatrix}} \frac{1}{g(d)}.$$

Then

$$S(A,P,z) \le \frac{X}{V(z)} + O\left({\sum_{\begin{smallmatrix} d_1,d_2 < z \\ d_1,d_2 \mid P(z)\end{smallmatrix}} \left\vert R_{[d_1,d_2]} \right\vert} \right)$$

where $[d_1,d_2]$ denotes the least common multiple of $d_1$ and $d_2$. It is often useful to estimate $V(z)$ by the bound

$$V(z) \ge \sum_{d \le z} \frac{1}{f(d)} . \,$$

== Applications ==
- The Brun–Titchmarsh theorem on the number of primes in arithmetic progression;
- The number of n ≤ x such that n is coprime to φ(n) is asymptotic to e^{−γ} x / log log log (x) .
