= Istanbul Center for Mathematical Sciences =

Mathematics Center

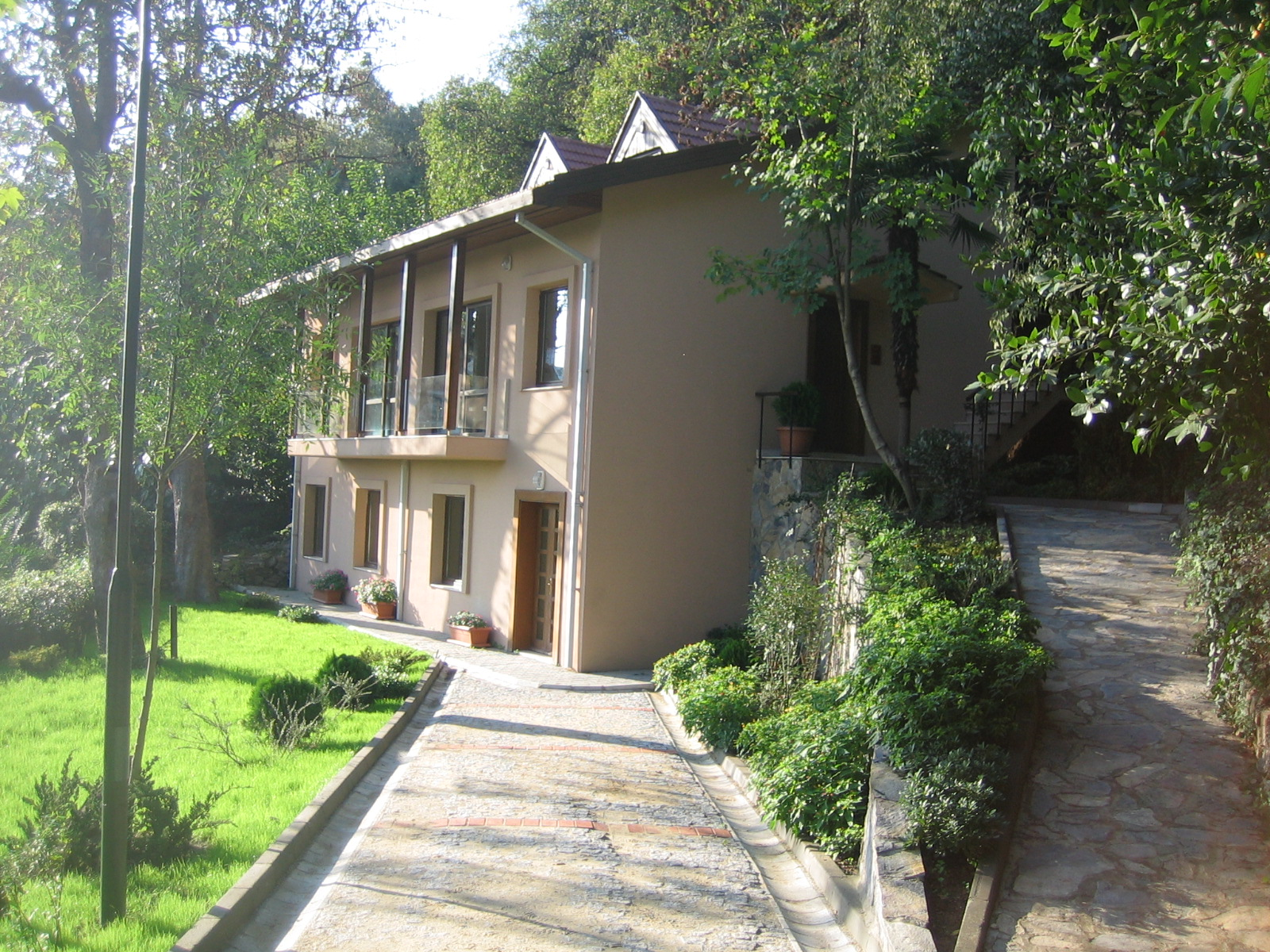
Sideviews of the center. Façade facing Bosphorus.

The Istanbul Center for Mathematical Sciences (IMBM) is an independent center for mathematics situated in the South Campus of Boğaziçi University, Istanbul, near the Mathematics Department. The center was initiated by several major universities in Istanbul and was formally inaugurated in 2006. The center aims to host and encourage the mathematical research and the interaction of researchers.

== Background ==
IMBM is currently the only center for mathematics in Turkey. It was proposed by Betül Tanbay in 2003, then the chairwoman of the Mathematics Department of Boğaziçi University to its rector Sabih Tansal who immediately allocated a site. The center was opened in 2006 by the rectors of three universities in Istanbul, Boğaziçi University, Koç University and Sabancı University. At that time, the three rectors were all mathematicians, Ayşe Soysal, Attila Aşkar and Tosun Terzioğlu respectively, which made the contract easier. The universities provided academic and from time to time small amounts of financial support. An account of the history can be found in EMS Newsletter.

IMBM is administrated by a management committee, a scientific steering committee, and an international scientific advisory board. The scientific advisory board consists of the following mathematicians: David Mumford from Brown and Harvard, Victor Kac from MIT, Selman Akbulut from Michigan State University, Gilles Pisier from Paris VI and Texas A&M , Edriss Titi from Weizmann Institute and University of California Irvine. David Mumford agreed to join the Scientific Advisory Board during his visit to Turkey back in 2003. He has reported his personal observations in Notices of the AMS.

The opening seminar of IMBM was delivered by Dan Goldston, János Pintz and Cem Yalçın Yıldırım in 2006. Since then, the center has hosted many activities with distinguished participants.

Resources of IMBM come from endowment income, personal and institutional grants and collaboration agreements and gifts.

== Buildings ==
There are two buildings of the center. Both have an excellent view of the Bosphorus strait. The buildings had been in very bad condition and were brought to life by the initiative of Betül Tanbay from Boğaziçi University Mathematics Department, the first codirector of IMBM. The first floor of the main building consists of three offices with a modest library and computers. A 40-person seminar room is on the second floor.

There are four bedrooms of the center, accommodating up to six people. Two bedrooms are located in the last floor of the main building. The other two are located in a self-contained one-storey house next to the main building, which has, besides, a kitchen and a living room.
