= Landau's problems =

Four basic unsolved problems about prime numbers

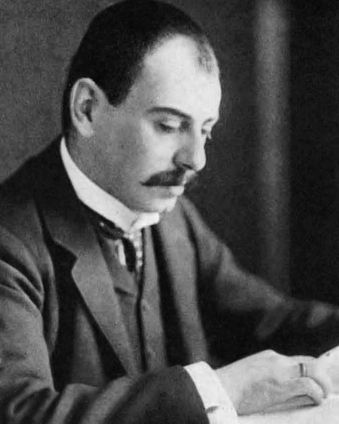
Edmund Landau, German mathematician

At the 1912 International Congress of Mathematicians, Edmund Landau listed four basic problems about prime numbers. These problems were characterised in his speech as "unattackable at the present state of mathematics" and are now known as Landau's problems. They are as follows:

1. Goldbach's conjecture: Can every even integer greater than 2 be written as the sum of two primes?
2. Twin prime conjecture: Are there infinitely many primes p such that p + 2 is prime?
3. Legendre's conjecture: Does there always exist at least one prime between consecutive perfect squares?
4. Are there infinitely many primes p such that p − 1 is a perfect square? In other words: Are there infinitely many primes of the form n^{2} + 1?

As of 2026, all four problems are unresolved.

== Progress toward solutions ==
=== Goldbach's conjecture ===
Goldbach's weak conjecture, every odd number greater than 5 can be expressed as the sum of three primes, is a consequence of Goldbach's conjecture. Ivan Vinogradov proved it for large enough n (Vinogradov's theorem) in 1937, and Harald Helfgott extended this to a full proof of Goldbach's weak conjecture in 2013.

Chen's theorem, another weakening of Goldbach's conjecture, proves that for all sufficiently large n, $2n=p+q$ where p is prime and q is either prime or semiprime. (Note: A semiprime is a natural number that is the product of two prime factors.) Bordignon, Johnston, and Starichkova, correcting and improving on Yamada, proved an explicit version of Chen's theorem: every even number greater than $e^{e^{32.7}} \approx 1.4\cdot10^{69057979807814}$ is the sum of a prime and a product of at most two primes. Bordignon and Starichkova reduce this to $e^{e^{15.85}} \approx 3.6\cdot10^{3321634}$ assuming the Generalized Riemann hypothesis (GRH) for Dirichlet L-functions. Johnston and Starichkova give a version working for all n ≥ 4 at the cost of using a number which is the product of at most 395 primes rather than a prime or semiprime; under GRH they improve 395 to 31.

Montgomery and Vaughan showed that the exceptional set of even numbers not expressible as the sum of two primes has a density zero, although the set is not proven to be finite. The best current bounds on the exceptional set is $E(x) < x^{0.72}$ (for large enough x) due to Pintz, and $E(x) \ll x^{0.5}\log^3 x$ under RH, due to Goldston.

Linnik proved that large enough even numbers could be expressed as the sum of two primes and some (ineffective) constant K of powers of 2. Following many advances (see Pintz for an overview), Pintz and Ruzsa improved this to K = 8. Assuming the GRH, this can be improved to K = 7.

=== Twin prime conjecture ===
In 2013 Yitang Zhang showed that there are infinitely many prime pairs with gap bounded by 70 million, and this result has been improved to gaps of length 246 by a collaborative effort of the Polymath Project. Under the generalized Elliott–Halberstam conjecture this was improved to 6, extending earlier work by Maynard and Goldston, Pintz and Yıldırım.

In 1966 Chen showed that there are infinitely many primes p (later called Chen primes) such that p + 2 is either a prime or a semiprime.

=== Legendre's conjecture ===
It suffices to check that each prime gap starting at p is smaller than $2 \sqrt p$. A table of maximal prime gaps shows that the conjecture holds to 2^{64} ≈ 1.8×10^{19}. A counterexample near that size would require a prime gap a hundred million times the size of the average gap.

Järviniemi, improving on work by Heath-Brown and by Matomäki, shows that there are at most $x^{7/100+\varepsilon}$ exceptional primes followed by gaps larger than $\sqrt{2p}$; in particular,

$$\sum_{\stackrel{p_{n+1}-p_n > \sqrt{p_n}^{1/2}}{p_n \leq x}}p_{n+1}-p_n\ll x^{0.57+\varepsilon}.$$

A result due to Ingham shows that there is a prime between $n^3$ and $(n+1)^3$ for every large enough n.

=== Near-square primes ===
Landau's fourth problem asked whether there are infinitely many primes which are of the form $p=n^2+1$ for integer n. (The list of known primes of this form is A002496.) The existence of infinitely many such primes would follow as a consequence of other number-theoretic conjectures such as the Bunyakovsky conjecture and Bateman–Horn conjecture.

One example of near-square primes are Fermat primes. Henryk Iwaniec showed that there are infinitely many numbers of the form $n^2+1$ with at most two prime factors. Ankeny and Kubilius proved that, assuming the extended Riemann hypothesis for L-functions on Hecke characters, there are infinitely many primes of the form $p=x^2+y^2$ with $y=O(\log p)$. Landau's conjecture is for the stronger $y=1$. The best unconditional result is due to Harman and Lewis and it gives $y=O(p^{0.119})$. In 2024, Ben Green and Mehtaab Sawhney proved that infinitely many primes are of the form $p^2+nq^2$ for any given $n\equiv0$ or $n\equiv4}\pmod{6$, noting that "the argument could surely be modified in a straightforward manner to handle arbitrary positive definite binary quadratic forms over $\mathbb{Z}$".

Grimmelt & Merikoski, improving on previous works, showed that there are infinitely many numbers of the form $n^2+1$ with greatest prime factor at least $n^{1.312}$. Replacing the exponent with 2 would yield Landau's conjecture.

The Friedlander–Iwaniec theorem shows that infinitely many primes are of the form $x^2+y^4$.

Baier and Zhao prove that there are infinitely many primes of the form $p=an^2+1$ with $a < p^{5/9+\varepsilon}$; the exponent can be improved to $1/2+\varepsilon$ under the Generalized Riemann Hypothesis for L-functions and to $\varepsilon$ under a certain Elliott-Halberstam type hypothesis.

The Brun sieve establishes an upper bound on the density of primes having the form $p=n^2+1$: there are $O(\sqrt x/\log x)$ such primes up to $x$. Hence almost all numbers of the form $n^2+1$ are composite.

== See also ==
- List of unsolved problems in mathematics
- Hilbert's problems
