= Cousin prime =

Prime numbers which differ by 4

In number theory, cousin primes are prime numbers that differ by four. Compare this with twin primes, pairs of prime numbers that differ by two, and sexy primes, pairs of prime numbers that differ by six.

The cousin primes (sequences OEIS: A023200 and OEIS: A046132 in OEIS) below 1000 are:

(3, 7), (7, 11), (13, 17), (19, 23), (37, 41), (43, 47), (67, 71), (79, 83), (97, 101), (103, 107), (109, 113), (127, 131), (163, 167), (193, 197), (223, 227), (229, 233), (277, 281), (307, 311), (313, 317), (349, 353), (379, 383), (397, 401), (439, 443), (457, 461), (463,467), (487, 491), (499, 503), (613, 617), (643, 647), (673, 677), (739, 743), (757, 761), (769, 773), (823, 827), (853, 857), (859, 863), (877, 881), (883, 887), (907, 911), (937, 941), (967, 971)

== Properties ==
The only prime belonging to two pairs of cousin primes is 7. One of the numbers n, n + 4, n + 8 will always be divisible by 3, so n = 3 is the only case where all three are primes.

An example of a large proven cousin prime pair is (p, p + 4) for

$$p = 4111286921397 \times 2^{66420} + 1$$

which has 20008 digits. In fact, this is part of a prime triple since p is also a twin prime (because p − 2 is also a proven prime).

As of December 2024, the largest-known pair of cousin primes was found by S. Batalov and has 86,138 digits. The primes are:

$$p = (29571282950 \times (2^{190738} - 1) + 4) \times 2^{95369} - 1$$
$p+4 = (29571282950 \times (2^{190738} - 1) + 4) \times 2^{95369} + 3$

If the first Hardy–Littlewood conjecture holds, then cousin primes have the same asymptotic density as twin primes. An analogue of Brun's constant for twin primes can be defined for cousin primes, called Brun's constant for cousin primes, with the initial term (3, 7) omitted, by the convergent sum:

$$B_4 = \left(\frac{1}{7} + \frac{1}{11}\right) + \left(\frac{1}{13} + \frac{1}{17}\right) + \left(\frac{1}{19} + \frac{1}{23}\right) + \cdots.$$

Using cousin primes up to 2^{42}, the value of B_{4} was estimated by Marek Wolf in 1996 as

$B_4 \approx 1.1970449$

This constant should not be confused with Brun's constant for prime quadruplets, which is also denoted B_{4}.

The Skewes number for cousin primes is 5206837 (Tóth (2019)).
