= Prime quadruplet =

Set of prime numbers {p, p+2, p+6, p+8}

In number theory, a prime quadruplet (sometimes called a prime quadruple) is a set of four prime numbers of the form {p, p + 2, p + 6, p + 8}. This represents the closest possible grouping of four primes larger than 3, and is the only prime constellation of length 4.

== Prime quadruplets ==
The first eight prime quadruplets are:

{5, 7, 11, 13}, {11, 13, 17, 19}, {101, 103, 107, 109}, {191, 193, 197, 199}, {821, 823, 827, 829}, {1481, 1483, 1487, 1489}, {1871, 1873, 1877, 1879}, {2081, 2083, 2087, 2089} (sequence A007530 in the OEIS)

All prime quadruplets except {5, 7, 11, 13} are of the form {30n + 11, 30n + 13, 30n + 17, 30n + 19} for some integer n. This structure is necessary to ensure that none of the four primes are divisible by 2, 3 or 5. In decimal, primes in such a quadruplet differ only in their last digit, being 1, 3, 7 and 9 respectively. Thus a prime quadruplet of this form is called a prime decade.

A prime quadruplet can be described as a consecutive pair of twin primes, two overlapping sets of prime triplets, or two intermixed pairs of sexy primes. These "quad" primes can also form the core of prime quintuplets and prime sextuplets when adding or subtracting 8 from their centers yields a prime.

All prime decades starting above 5 have centers of the form 210n + 15, 210n + 105, or 210n + 195, since the centers must be −1, 0, or 1, modulo 7. The +15 form may also give rise to a (high) prime quintuplet; the +195 form can also give rise to a (low) quintuplet; while the +105 form can yield both types of quintuplets and possibly prime sextuplets. It is no accident that each prime in a prime decade is displaced from its center by a power of 2, since all centers are odd and divisible by both 3 and 5.

It is not known if there are infinitely many prime quadruplets. A proof that there are infinitely many would imply the twin prime conjecture, but it is consistent with current knowledge that there may be infinitely many pairs of twin primes and only finitely many prime quadruplets. However, it is conjectured that there are infinitely many prime quadruplets. The number of prime quadruplets with n digits in base 10 for n = 2, 3, 4, ... is

1, 3, 7, 27, 128, 733, 3869, 23620, 152141, 1028789, 7188960, 51672312, 381226246, 2873279651 (sequence A120120 in the OEIS).

It is conjectured that the asymptotic formula for the number of prime quadruplets below n is $C \frac{x}{(\ln x)^4}$, where $C \sim 4.151180863$ (sequence A061642 in the OEIS).

As of February 2019 the largest known prime quadruplet has 10132 digits. It starts with p = 667674063382677 × 2^{33608} − 1, found by Peter Kaiser.

The constant representing the sum of the reciprocals of all prime quadruplets, Brun's constant for prime quadruplets, denoted by B_{4}, is the sum of the reciprocals of all prime quadruplets:

$$B_4 = \left(\frac{1}{5} + \frac{1}{7} + \frac{1}{11} + \frac{1}{13}\right)
+ \left(\frac{1}{11} + \frac{1}{13} + \frac{1}{17} + \frac{1}{19}\right)
+ \left(\frac{1}{101} + \frac{1}{103} + \frac{1}{107} + \frac{1}{109}\right) + \cdots$$

with value:

B_{4} = 0.87058 83800 ± 0.00000 00005.

This constant should not be confused with the Brun's constant for cousin primes, prime pairs of the form (p, p + 4), which is also written as B_{4}.

The prime quadruplet {11, 13, 17, 19} is alleged to appear on the Ishango bone although this is disputed.

Excluding the first prime quadruplet, the shortest possible distance between two quadruplets {p, p + 2, p + 6, p + 8} and {q, q + 2, q + 6, q + 8} is q − p = 30. The first occurrences of this are for p = 1006301, 2594951, 3919211, 9600551, 10531061, ... (OEIS: A059925).

The Skewes number for prime quadruplets {p, p + 2, p + 6, p + 8} is 1172531 (Tóth (2019)).

== Prime quintuplets ==
If {p, p + 2, p + 6, p + 8} is a prime quadruplet and p − 4 or p + 12 is also prime, then the five primes form a prime quintuplet which is the closest admissible constellation of five primes. The first few prime quintuplets with p + 12 are:

{5, 7, 11, 13, 17}, {11, 13, 17, 19, 23}, {101, 103, 107, 109, 113}, {1481, 1483, 1487, 1489, 1493}, {16061, 16063, 16067, 16069, 16073}, {19421, 19423, 19427, 19429, 19433}, {21011, 21013, 21017, 21019, 21023}, {22271, 22273, 22277, 22279, 22283}, {43781, 43783, 43787, 43789, 43793}, {55331, 55333, 55337, 55339, 55343} … OEIS: A022006.

The first prime quintuplets with p − 4 are:

{7, 11, 13, 17, 19}, {97, 101, 103, 107, 109}, {1867, 1871, 1873, 1877, 1879}, {3457, 3461, 3463, 3467, 3469}, {5647, 5651, 5653, 5657, 5659}, {15727, 15731, 15733, 15737, 15739}, {16057, 16061, 16063, 16067, 16069}, {19417, 19421, 19423, 19427, 19429}, {43777, 43781, 43783, 43787, 43789}, {79687, 79691, 79693, 79697, 79699}, {88807, 88811, 88813, 88817, 88819} ... OEIS: A022007.

A prime quintuplet contains two close pairs of twin primes, a prime quadruplet, and three overlapping prime triplets. The first prime of a quintuplet starting above 5 will end with the digit 1 or 7 in base 10 and the last prime will end with the digit 3 or 9.

It is not known if there are infinitely many prime quintuplets. Once again, proving the twin prime conjecture might not necessarily prove that there are also infinitely many prime quintuplets. Also, proving that there are infinitely many prime quadruplets might not necessarily prove that there are infinitely many prime quintuplets.

The Skewes number for prime quintuplets {p, p + 2, p + 6, p + 8, p + 12} is 21432401 (Tóth (2019)).

== Prime sextuplets ==
If both p − 4 and p + 12 are prime then it becomes a prime sextuplet. The first few:

{7, 11, 13, 17, 19, 23}, {97, 101, 103, 107, 109, 113}, {16057, 16061, 16063, 16067, 16069, 16073}, {19417, 19421, 19423, 19427, 19429, 19433}, {43777, 43781, 43783, 43787, 43789, 43793} OEIS: A022008

Some sources also call {5, 7, 11, 13, 17, 19} a prime sextuplet. Our definition, all cases of primes {p − 4, p, p + 2, p + 6, p + 8, p + 12}, follows from defining a prime sextuplet as the closest admissible constellation of six primes.

A prime sextuplet contains two close pairs of twin primes, a prime quadruplet, four overlapping prime triplets, and two overlapping prime quintuplets. The first prime of a sextuplet will end with the digit 7 in base 10 and the last prime will end with the digit 3.

All prime sextuplets except {7, 11, 13, 17, 19, 23} are of the form
$$\{210n + 97,\ 210n + 101,\ 210n + 103,\ 210n + 107,\ 210n + 109,\ 210n + 113\}$$
for some integer n. (This structure is necessary to ensure that none of the six primes is divisible by 2, 3, 5 or 7).

It is not known if there are infinitely many prime sextuplets. Once again, proving the twin prime conjecture might not necessarily prove that there are also infinitely many prime sextuplets. Also, proving that there are infinitely many prime quintuplets might not necessarily prove that there are infinitely many prime sextuplets.

A prime sextuplet is the largest k-tuple with spacing no greater than 4 between primes.

The Skewes number for the tuplet {p, p + 4, p + 6, p + 10, p + 12, p + 16} is 251331775687 (Tóth (2019)).

== Prime k-tuples ==
Prime quadruplets, quintuplets, and sextuplets are examples of prime constellations, and prime constellations are in turn examples of prime k-tuples. A prime constellation is a grouping of k primes, with minimum prime p and maximum prime p + n, meeting the following two conditions:

- Not all residues modulo q are represented for any prime q
- For any given k, the value of n is the minimum possible

More generally, a prime k-tuple occurs if the first condition but not necessarily the second condition is met.
