= Prime triplet =

Set of 3 prime numbers whose largest and smallest differ by 6

In number theory, a prime triplet is a set of three prime numbers in which the smallest and largest of the three differ by 6. In particular, the sets must have the form (p, p + 2, p + 6) or (p, p + 4, p + 6). With the exceptions of (2, 3, 5) and (3, 5, 7), this is the closest possible grouping of three prime numbers, since one of every three sequential odd numbers is a multiple of three, and hence not prime (except for 3 itself).

== Examples ==
The first prime triplets (sequence A098420 in the OEIS) are

(5, 7, 11), (7, 11, 13), (11, 13, 17), (13, 17, 19), (17, 19, 23), (37, 41, 43), (41, 43, 47), (67, 71, 73), (97, 101, 103), (101, 103, 107), (103, 107, 109), (107, 109, 113), (191, 193, 197), (193, 197, 199), (223, 227, 229), (227, 229, 233), (277, 281, 283), (307, 311, 313), (311, 313, 317), (347, 349, 353), (457, 461, 463), (461, 463, 467), (613, 617, 619), (641, 643, 647), (821, 823, 827), (823, 827, 829), (853, 857, 859), (857, 859, 863), (877, 881, 883), (881, 883, 887)

== Subpairs of primes ==
A prime triplet contains a single pair of:

- Twin primes: (p, p + 2) or (p + 4, p + 6);
- Cousin primes: (p, p + 4) or (p + 2, p + 6); and
- Sexy primes: (p, p + 6).

== Higher-order versions ==
A prime can be a member of up to three prime triplets - for example, 103 is a member of (97, 101, 103), (101, 103, 107) and (103, 107, 109). When this happens, the five involved primes form a prime quintuplet.

A prime quadruplet (p, p + 2, p + 6, p + 8) contains two overlapping prime triplets, (p, p + 2, p + 6) and (p + 2, p + 6, p + 8).

== Conjecture on prime triplets ==
Similarly to the twin prime conjecture, it is conjectured that there are infinitely many prime triplets. The first known gigantic prime triplet was found in 2008 by Norman Luhn and François Morain. The primes are (p, p + 2, p + 6) with p = 2072644824759 × 2^{33333} − 1. As of October 2020 the largest known proven prime triplet contains primes with 20008 digits, namely the primes (p, p + 2, p + 6) with p = 4111286921397 × 2^{66420} − 1.

The Skewes number for the triplet (p, p + 2, p + 6) is 87613571, and for the triplet (p, p + 4, p + 6) it is 337867.
