= Lusin's theorem =

Theorem in measure theory

In the mathematical field of mathematical analysis, Lusin's theorem (or Luzin's theorem, named for Nikolai Luzin) or Lusin's criterion states that an almost-everywhere finite function is measurable if and only if it is a continuous function on nearly all its domain. In the informal formulation of J. E. Littlewood, "every measurable function is nearly continuous".

== Classical statement ==
For an interval [a, b], let

$$f:[a,b]\rightarrow \mathbb{C}$$

be a measurable function. Then, for every ε > 0, there exists a compact E ⊆ [a, b] such that f restricted to E is continuous and

$$\mu ( E ) > b - a - \varepsilon.$$

Note that E inherits the subspace topology from [a, b]; continuity of f restricted to E is defined using this topology.

Also for any function f, defined on the interval [a, b] and almost-everywhere finite, if for any ε > 0 there is a function ϕ, continuous on [a, b], such that the measure of the set

$$\{x\in[a,b]:f(x) \neq \phi(x)\}$$

is less than ε, then f is measurable.

== General form ==
Let $(X,\Sigma,\mu)$ be a Radon measure space and Y be a second-countable topological space equipped with a Borel algebra, and let $f: X \rightarrow Y$ be a measurable function. Given $\varepsilon>0$, for every $A\in\Sigma$ of finite measure there is a closed set $E$ with $\mu(A\setminus E) <\varepsilon$ such that $f$ restricted to $E$ is continuous.

(If $A$ is locally compact and $Y=\mathbb{R}^d$, we can choose $E$ to be compact and even find a continuous function $f_\varepsilon: X \rightarrow \mathbb{R}^d$ with compact support that coincides with $f$ on $E$ and such that

$\ \sup_{x\in X} | f_\varepsilon (x) | \leq \sup_{x\in X} | f(x) |$.)

Informally, measurable functions into spaces with countable base can be approximated by continuous functions on arbitrarily large portion of their domain.

== On the proof ==
The proof of Lusin's theorem can be found in many classical books. Intuitively, one expects it as a consequence of Egorov's theorem and density of smooth functions. Egorov's theorem states that pointwise convergence is nearly uniform, and uniform convergence preserves continuity.

== Example ==
The strength of Lusin's theorem might not be readily apparent, as can be demonstrated by example. Consider Dirichlet function, that is the indicator function $1_\mathbb{Q}:[0,1]\to \{0,1\}$ on the unit interval $[0,1]$ taking the value of one on the rationals, and zero, otherwise. Clearly the measure of this function should be zero, but how can one find regions that are continuous, given that the rationals are dense in the reals? The requirements for Lusin's theorem can be satisfied with the following construction of a set $E.$

Let $\{x_n; n=1,2,\dots\}$ be any enumeration of $\mathbb{Q}$. Set

$$G_n=(x_n-\varepsilon/2^n,x_n+\varepsilon/2^n)$$

and

$$E:=[0,1]\setminus\bigcup_{n=1}^\infty G_n$$.

Then the sequence of open sets $G_n$ "knocks out" all of the rationals, leaving behind a compact, closed set $E$ which contains no rationals, and has a measure of more than $1-2\varepsilon$.
