= Prime k-tuple =

Repeatable pattern of differences between prime numbers

In number theory, a prime k-tuple is a finite collection of values representing a repeatable pattern of differences between prime numbers. For a k-tuple (a, b, …), the positions where the k-tuple matches a pattern in the prime numbers are given by the set of integers n for which all of the values (n + a, n + b, …) are prime. Typically the first value in the k-tuple is 0 and the rest are distinct positive even numbers.

== Named patterns ==
Several of the shortest k-tuples are known by other common names:

(0, 2)	twin primes
(0, 4)	cousin primes
(0, 6)	sexy primes
(0, 2, 6), (0, 4, 6)	prime triplets
(0, 6, 12)	sexy prime triplets
(0, 2, 6, 8)	prime quadruplets, prime decade
(0, 6, 12, 18)	sexy prime quadruplets
(0, 2, 6, 8, 12), (0, 4, 6, 10, 12)	prime quintuplets
(0, 4, 6, 10, 12, 16)	prime sextuplets

OEIS sequence A257124 covers 7-tuples (prime septuplets) and contains an overview of related sequences, e.g. the three sequences corresponding to the three admissible 8-tuples (prime octuplets), and the union of all 8-tuples. The first term in these sequences corresponds to the first prime in the smallest prime constellation shown below.

== Admissibility ==
In order for a k-tuple to have infinitely many positions at which all of its values are prime, there cannot exist a prime p such that the tuple includes every different possible value modulo p. If such a prime p existed, then no matter which value of n was chosen, one of the values formed by adding n to the tuple would be divisible by p, so the only possible placements would have to include p itself, and there are at most k of those. For example, the numbers in a k-tuple cannot take on all three values 0, 1, and 2 modulo 3; otherwise the resulting numbers would always include a multiple of 3 and therefore could not all be prime unless one of the numbers is 3 itself.

A k-tuple that includes every possible residue modulo p is said to be inadmissible modulo p. It should be obvious that this is only possible when k ≥ p. A tuple which is not inadmissible modulo p is called admissible.

It is conjectured that every admissible k-tuple matches infinitely many positions in the sequence of prime numbers. However, there is no tuple for which this has been proven except the trivial 1-tuple (0). In that case, the conjecture is equivalent to the statement that there are infinitely many primes. Nevertheless, Yitang Zhang proved in 2013 that there exists at least one 2-tuple which matches infinitely many positions; subsequent work showed that such a 2-tuple exists with values differing by 246 or less that matches infinitely many positions.

=== Positions matched by inadmissible patterns ===
Although (0, 2, 4) is inadmissible modulo 3, it does produce a single set of primes: (3, 5, 7).

Because 3 is the first odd prime, a non-trivial (k ≥ 1) k-tuple matching the prime 3 can only match in one position. If the tuple begins (0, 1, ...) (i.e. is inadmissible modulo 2) then it can only match (2, 3, ...); if the tuple contains only even numbers, it can only match (3, ...).

Inadmissible k-tuples can have more than one all-prime solution if they are admissible modulo 2 and 3, and inadmissible modulo p ≥ 5. This of course implies that there must be at least five numbers in the tuple. The shortest inadmissible tuple with more than one solution is the 5-tuple (0, 2, 8, 14, 26), which has two solutions: (3, 5, 11, 17, 29) and (5, 7, 13, 19, 31), where all values modulo 5 are included in both cases. Examples with three or more solutions also exist.

== Prime constellations ==
The diameter of a k-tuple is the difference of its largest and smallest elements. An admissible prime k-tuple with the smallest possible diameter d (among all admissible k-tuples) is a prime constellation. For all n ≥ k this will always produce consecutive primes. (Recall that all n are integers for which the values (n + a, n + b, …) are prime.)

This means that, for large n:

$$p_{n+k-1} - p_n \geq d$$

where p_{n} is the nth prime number.

The first few prime constellations are:

k	d	Constellation	Smallest
2	2	(0, 2)	(3, 5)
3	6	(0, 2, 6) (0, 4, 6)	(5, 7, 11) (7, 11, 13)
4	8	(0, 2, 6, 8)	(5, 7, 11, 13)
5	12	(0, 2, 6, 8, 12) (0, 4, 6, 10, 12)	(5, 7, 11, 13, 17) (7, 11, 13, 17, 19)
6	16	(0, 4, 6, 10, 12, 16)	(7, 11, 13, 17, 19, 23)
7	20	(0, 2, 6, 8, 12, 18, 20) (0, 2, 8, 12, 14, 18, 20)	(11, 13, 17, 19, 23, 29, 31) (5639, 5641, 5647, 5651, 5653, 5657, 5659)
8	26	(0, 2, 6, 8, 12, 18, 20, 26) (0, 2, 6, 12, 14, 20, 24, 26) (0, 6, 8, 14, 18, 20, 24, 26)	(11, 13, 17, 19, 23, 29, 31, 37) (17, 19, 23, 29, 31, 37, 41, 43) (88793, 88799, 88801, 88807, 88811, 88813, 88817, 88819)
9	30	(0, 2, 6, 8, 12, 18, 20, 26, 30) (0, 4, 6, 10, 16, 18, 24, 28, 30) (0, 2, 6, 12, 14, 20, 24, 26, 30) (0, 4, 10, 12, 18, 22, 24, 28, 30)	(11, 13, 17, 19, 23, 29, 31, 37, 41) (13, 17, 19, 23, 29, 31, 37, 41, 43) (17, 19, 23, 29, 31, 37, 41, 43, 47) (88789, 88793, 88799, 88801, 88807, 88811, 88813, 88817, 88819)

The diameter d as a function of k is sequence A008407 in the OEIS.

A prime constellation is sometimes referred to as a prime k-tuplet, but some authors reserve that term for instances that are not part of longer k-tuplets.

The first Hardy–Littlewood conjecture predicts that the asymptotic frequency of any prime constellation can be calculated. While the conjecture is unproven it is considered likely to be true. If that is the case, it implies that the second Hardy–Littlewood conjecture, in contrast, is false.

== Prime arithmetic progressions ==
A prime k-tuple of the form (0, n, 2n, 3n, …, (k − 1)n) is said to be a prime arithmetic progression. In order for such a k-tuple to meet the admissibility test, n must be a multiple of the primorial of k.

== Skewes numbers ==
The Skewes numbers for prime k-tuples are an extension of the definition of Skewes's number to prime k-tuples based on the first Hardy–Littlewood conjecture (Tóth (2019)). Let $P = (p,\ p+i_1,\ p+i_2,\ \dots\ ,\ p+i_k)$ denote a prime k-tuple, $\pi_P(x)$ the number of primes p below x such that $p,\ p+i_1,\ p+i_2,\ \dots\ ,\ p+i_k$ are all prime, let $\operatorname{li}_P(x) = \int_2^x \frac{dt}{(\ln t)^{k + 1}}$ and let $C_P$ denote its Hardy–Littlewood constant (see first Hardy–Littlewood conjecture). Then the first prime p that violates the Hardy–Littlewood inequality for the k-tuple P, i.e., such that

$$\pi_P(p) > C_P \operatorname{li}_P(p),$$

(if such a prime exists) is the Skewes number for P.

The table below shows the currently known Skewes numbers for prime k-tuples:

Prime k-tuple	Skewes number	Found by
$(p,\ p+2)$	1369391	Wolf (2011)
$(p,\ p+4)$	5206837	Tóth (2019)
$(p,\ p+2,\ p+6)$	87613571	Tóth (2019)
$(p,\ p+4,\ p+6)$	337867	Tóth (2019)
$(p,\ p+2,\ p+6,\ p+8)$	1172531	Tóth (2019)
$(p,\ p+4,\ p+6,\ p+10)$	827929093	Tóth (2019)
$(p,\ p+2,\ p+6,\ p+8,\ p+12)$	21432401	Tóth (2019)
$(p,\ p+4,\ p+6,\ p+10,\ p+12)$	216646267	Tóth (2019)
$(p,\ p+4,\ p+6,\ p+10,\ p+12,\ p+16)$	251331775687	Tóth (2019)
$(p,\ p+2,\ p+6,\ p+8,\ p+12,\ p+18,\ p+20)$	7572964186421	Pfoertner (2020)
$(p,\ p+2,\ p+8,\ p+12,\ p+14,\ p+18,\ p+20)$	214159878489239	Pfoertner (2020)
$(p,\ p+2,\ p+6,\ p+8,\ p+12,\ p+18,\ p+20,\ p+26)$	1203255673037261	Pfoertner / Luhn (2021)
$(p,\ p+2,\ p+6,\ p+12,\ p+14,\ p+20,\ p+24,\ p+26)$	523250002674163757	Pfoertner / Luhn (2021)
$(p,\ p+6,\ p+8,\ p+14,\ p+18,\ p+20,\ p+24,\ p+26)$	750247439134737983	Pfoertner / Luhn (2021)

The Skewes number (if it exists) for sexy primes $(p,\; p+6)$ is still unknown.
