= Subordination =

Subordination may refer to

- Subordination in a hierarchy (in military, society, etc.)
  - Insubordination, disobedience
- Subordination (linguistics)
- Subordination (finance)
- Subordination agreement, a legal document used to deprecate the claim of one party in favor of another
- Subordination (horse), a Thoroughbred racehorse

== In mathematics ==
- Littlewood subordination theorem
- Subordinate partition of unity in paracompact space

== See also ==
- Subordinator (disambiguation)
