= Cyril Offord =

British mathematician

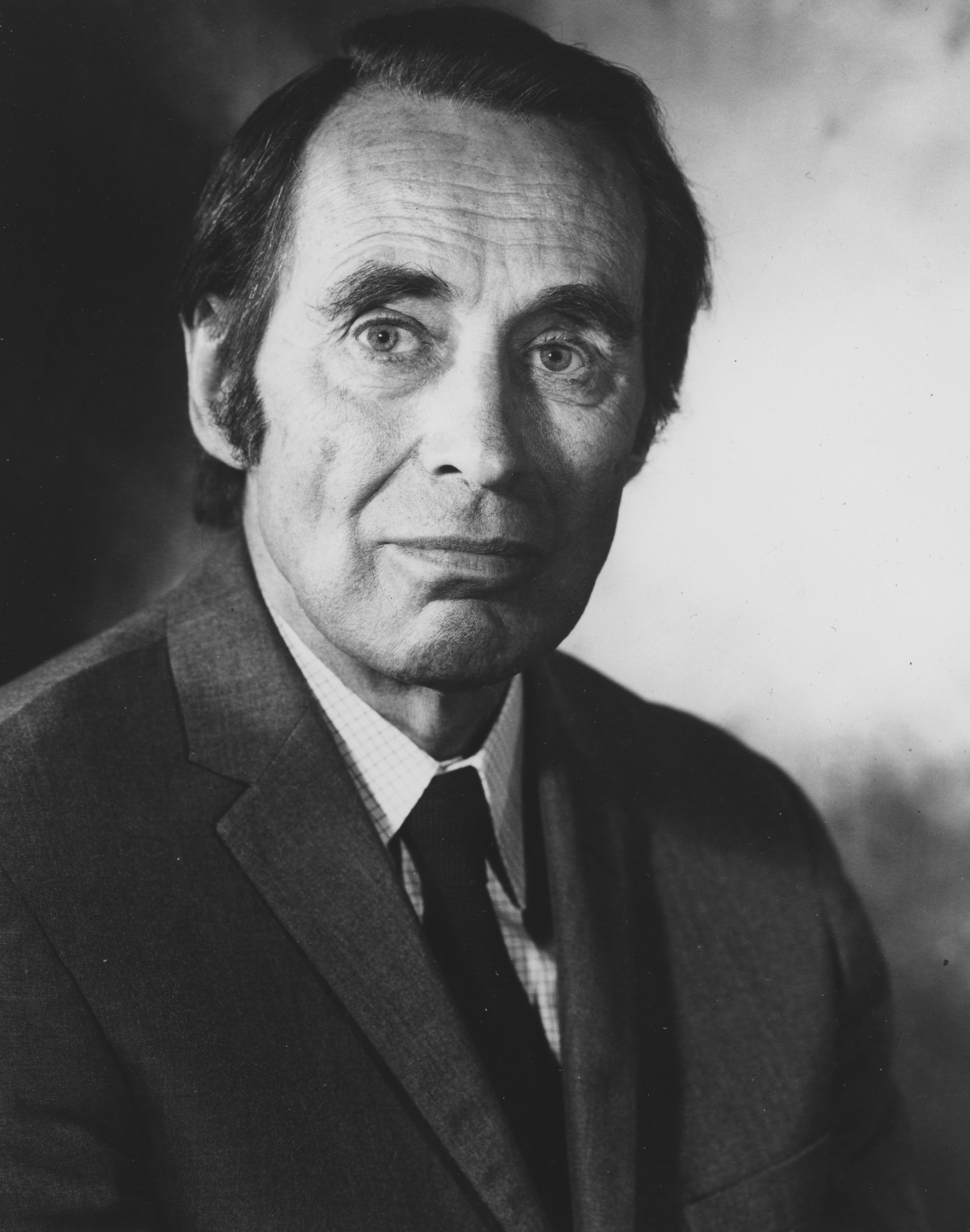
Cyril Offord, c. 1970

Albert Cyril Offord FRS FRSE (9 June 1906 – 4 June 2000) was a British mathematician. He was the first professor of mathematics at the London School of Economics.

== Life ==
He was born in London on 9 June 1906 the eldest child of Albert Edwin Offord, a master printer, and his wife Hester Louise, a former opera singer. The family were Plymouth Brethren. He was educated at Hackney Downs Grammar School. He then studied Mathematics at University College, London. He then went to St John's College, Cambridge as a postgraduate, working with Prof John Edensor Littlewood.

He received two Ph.D.s in mathematics: the first from the University of London (under Bosanquet) in 1932, the second from Cambridge (under Hardy) in 1936.

In 1940 he left Cambridge to lecture at University College, Bangor. In 1942 he moved to King's College, Newcastle-upon-Tyne (later being named the University of Newcastle). He was created Professor of Mathematics in 1945.

In 1946 he was elected a Fellow of the Royal Society of Edinburgh. His proposers were Sir Edmund Whittaker, John William Heslop-Harrison, Alexander Aitken and Alfred Dennis Hobson. He was elected a Fellow of the Royal Society of London in 1952.

In 1948 he left Newcastle to become Professor of Mathematics at Birkbeck College in London replacing Prof Dienes. He left in 1966 to take up a new chair at London School of Economics. He retired in 1973 then becoming a senior research fellow at Imperial College, London.

He died in Oxford on 4 June 2000.

== Family ==
In 1945 he married Margaret Yvonne Pickard (generally known as Rita), an English teacher. They had one daughter, Margaret Offord (born 1949).

== See also ==
- Littlewood–Offord problem
