= Subordinator =

Subordinator may refer to

- Subordination (linguistics), hierarchical organization in linguistics
- Subordinating conjunction or subordinator, a class of conjunctions in linguistics
- Subordinator (mathematics), a stochastic process

== See also ==
- Subordination (disambiguation)
