= Brun's theorem =

Theorem that the sum of the reciprocals of the twin primes converges

The convergence to Brun's constant (B_{2}). Each dot represents the effect of an additional pair of twin primes. While the exact value of B_{2} is unknown, it is thought to be around 1.9 (Red Line). Calculations have shown it to be greater than 1.83 (Blue line).

In number theory, Brun's theorem states that the sum of the reciprocals of the twin primes converges to a finite value known as Brun's constant. While its exact value is unknown, it is approximately equal to

$B_2 \approx 1.90216058$ (sequence A065421 in the OEIS).

Brun's theorem was proved by Viggo Brun in 1919. It has historical importance in the introduction of sieve methods.

== Asymptotic bounds on twin primes ==
The convergence of the sum of reciprocals of twin primes follows from bounds on the density of the sequence of twin primes. Let $\pi_2(x)$ denote the number of primes $p\leq x$ for which $p + 2$ is also prime; that is, $\pi_2(x)$ is the number of twin primes with the smaller at most $x$. Then we have

$$\pi_2(x) = O\bigg(\frac {x(\log\log x)^2}{(\log x)^2} \bigg).$$

Essentially, twin primes are less frequent than prime numbers by nearly a logarithmic factor. This bound gives the intuition that the sum of the reciprocals of the twin primes converges, or stated differently, the twin primes form a small set. In explicit terms, the sum

$$\sum\limits_{ p \, : \, p + 2 \in \mathbb{P} } {\left( {\frac{1}{p} + \frac{1}{{p + 2}}} \right)}  = \left( {\frac{1}{3} + \frac{1}{5}} \right) + \left( {\frac{1}{5} + \frac{1}{7}} \right) + \left( {\frac{1}{{11}} + \frac{1}{{13}}} \right) +  \cdots$$

converges: its value is Brun's constant.

This sum diverging would imply that there are infinitely many twin primes. Because the sum instead converges, it is not possible to conclude whether there are finitely many or infinitely many twin primes. Brun's constant is irrational only if there are infinitely many twin primes.

== Numerical estimates ==
The series converges extremely slowly. Thomas Nicely remarked that after summing the first billion (10^{9}) terms, the relative error is still more than 5%.

By calculating the twin primes up to 10^{14} (and discovering the Pentium FDIV bug along the way), Nicely heuristically estimated Brun's constant to be 1.902160578. Nicely has extended his computation to 1.6×10^{15} as of 18 January 2010 but this is not the largest computation of its type.

In 2002, Pascal Sebah and Patrick Demichel used all twin primes up to 10^{16} to give the estimate that B_{2} ≈ 1.902160583104. Hence,

Year	B_{2}	set of twin primes below #	by
1976	1.902160540	1 × 10^{11}	Brent
1996	1.902160578	1 × 10^{14}	Nicely
2002	1.902160583104	1 × 10^{16}	Sebah and Demichel

The last is based on extrapolation from the sum 1.830484424658... for the twin primes below 10^{16}. Dominic Klyve showed conditionally (in an unpublished thesis) that B_{2} < 2.1754, assuming the extended Riemann hypothesis. In 2025, Lachlan Dunn showed B_{2} < 2.1609, assuming the generalised Riemann hypothesis. Richard Crandall and Carl Pomerance have shown unconditionally that B_{2} < 2.347.

There is also a Brun's constant for prime quadruplets. A prime quadruplet is a pair of two twin prime pairs, separated by a distance of 4 (the smallest possible distance). The first prime quadruplets are (5, 7, 11, 13), (11, 13, 17, 19), (101, 103, 107, 109). Brun's constant for prime quadruplets, denoted by B_{4}, is the sum of the reciprocals of all prime quadruplets:

$$B_4 = \left(\frac{1}{5} + \frac{1}{7} + \frac{1}{11} + \frac{1}{13}\right)
+ \left(\frac{1}{11} + \frac{1}{13} + \frac{1}{17} + \frac{1}{19}\right)
+ \left(\frac{1}{101} + \frac{1}{103} + \frac{1}{107} + \frac{1}{109}\right) + \cdots$$

with value

$$B_4 = 0.8705883800 \pm 0.0000000005$$,

the error range having a 99% confidence level.

This constant should not be confused with the Brun's constant for cousin primes, as prime pairs of the form (p, p + 4), which is also written as $B_4$. Wolf derived an estimate for the Brun-type sums $B_4$ of $4/n$.

== Further results ==
Let $C_2=0.6601\ldots$ (sequence A005597 in the OEIS) be the twin prime constant. Then it is conjectured that

$$\pi_2(x) \sim 2C_2\frac{x}{(\log x)^2}.$$

In particular,

$$\pi_2(x) < (2C_2+\varepsilon)\frac{x}{(\log x)^2}$$

for every $\varepsilon>0$ and all sufficiently large x.

Many special cases of the above have been proved. Jie Wu proved that for sufficiently large x,

$$\pi_2(x) \le 3.3996\cdot2C_2\,\frac{x}{(\log x)^2} < 4.5\,\frac{x}{(\log x)^2}.$$

=== In popular culture ===
The digits of Brun's constant were used in a bid of $1,902,160,540 in the Nortel patent auction. The bid was posted by Google and was one of three Google bids based on mathematical constants. Furthermore, academic research on the constant ultimately resulted in the Pentium FDIV bug becoming a notable public relations fiasco for Intel.

== See also ==
- Divergence of the sum of the reciprocals of the primes
- Meissel–Mertens constant
