= Stanley Skewes =

South African mathematician (1899–1988)

- Skewes (left) in Zürich 1932
- Born: 29 June 1899; Germiston, South African Republic
- Died: 19 December 1988 (Aged 89); Cape Town, South Africa
- Education: University of Cape Town; University of Cambridge
- Known for: Skewes's numbers
- Spouse: Ena Allen
- Scientific career
- Academic advisors: John Edensor Littlewood

Stanley Skewes (/skjuːz/; 1899–1988) was a South African mathematician, best known for his discovery of the Skewes's number in 1933. He was one of John Edensor Littlewood's students at Cambridge University. Skewes's numbers contributed to the refinement of the theory of prime numbers.

== Academic career ==
Skewes obtained a degree in civil engineering from the University of Cape Town before emigrating to England. He studied mathematics at Cambridge University and obtained a PhD in mathematics in 1938.

He discovered the first Skewes's number in 1933. This is also referred to as the Riemann true Skewes's number owing to its relationship to the Riemann hypothesis as related to prime number theory. He discovered the second Skewes's number in 1955. This number was applicable if the Riemann hypothesis is false. Since his original discovery the numbers have been further refined.

== Publications ==
- Skewes, S. (1933). "On the difference π(x) − Li(x) (I)". Journal of the London Mathematical Society. 8 (4): 277–283. doi:10.1112/jlms/s1-8.4.277.
- Skewes, S. (1955). "On the difference π(x) − Li(x) (II)". Proceedings of the London Mathematical Society. 5 (17): 48–70. doi:10.1112/plms/s3-5.1.48.

== Personal life ==
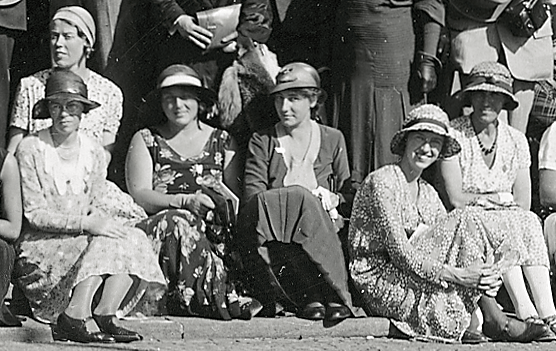
Ms. Skewes (left, foreground) accompanied Stanley Skewes at the ICM, Zürich 1932.

Stanley Skewes was born in Germiston, South Africa in 1899. His parents were Henry (Harry) Skewes, a tin miner and assayer from Cury, Cornwall, England and Emily Moyle, who was American by birth. His parents moved from Redruth, Cornwall in 1894 to the Transvaal, South Africa.

He married Ena Allen. She was the daughter of the head chef at King's College, Cambridge, and a talented opera singer. Among his contemporaries at Cambridge was Alan Turing. They rowed together at Cambridge. Although Skewes returned to South Africa, he revisited Cambridge and Cornwall. He was also a keen rugby player in his youth.

Skewes and his number are discussed by Isaac Asimov in his book Of Matters Great and Small and in the 20th edition of the Guinness Book of Records. A memorandum written by Skewes on his retirement was kept in a glass case in the department of mathematics at the University of Cape Town. The memorandum discuses Skewes's number and further development of it.

He died in 1988 in Cape Town, South Africa.
