= Littlewood conjecture =

Open conjecture in multiplicative Diophantine approximation

Unsolved problem in mathematics
Is $\liminf_{n\to\infty}n\|n\alpha\|\|n\beta\|=0$ for every pair of real numbers $\alpha,\beta$?
More unsolved problems in mathematics

In Diophantine approximation, the Littlewood conjecture is an open problem concerning the simultaneous approximation of two real numbers by rational numbers with the same denominator. It states that, for every pair of real numbers $\alpha$ and $\beta$,
$$\liminf_{n\to\infty} n\,\|n\alpha\|\,\|n\beta\|=0,$$
where
$$\|x\|=\min_{m\in\mathbb Z}|x-m|$$
is the distance from $x$ to the nearest integer.

The conjecture was proposed by J. E. Littlewood around 1930 and remains unresolved. It holds immediately if either number is rational or, more generally, is not badly approximable. Thus any counterexample would have to consist of two badly approximable numbers such that $1,\alpha,\beta$ are linearly independent over $\mathbb Q$.

For almost every pair, a stronger assertion was proved by Patrick Gallagher in 1962. In 2006, Manfred Einsiedler, Anatole Katok and Elon Lindenstrauss proved that the set of counterexamples has Hausdorff dimension zero, using rigidity of invariant measures for higher-rank diagonal actions on homogeneous spaces.

== Statement and elementary cases ==
The limit-inferior formulation is equivalent to saying that, for every $\varepsilon>0$, there are infinitely many positive integers $n$ such that
$$n\,\|n\alpha\|\,\|n\beta\|<\varepsilon.$$
Geometrically, consider the orbit
$$n(\alpha,\beta)\pmod{\mathbb Z^2}
\qquad(n=1,2,\ldots)$$
on the two-dimensional torus. The two factors $\|n\alpha\|$ and $\|n\beta\|$ are the coordinate distances of this point from the integer lattice. The conjecture says that their product is $o(1/n)$ along a subsequence; it does not require either coordinate distance separately to be $o(1/n)$.

If $p$ and $q$ are nearest integers to $n\alpha$ and $n\beta$, respectively, then the same inequality can be written
$$\left|\alpha-\frac pn\right|
\left|\beta-\frac qn\right|
<\frac{\varepsilon}{n^3}.$$
Thus the conjecture asks for unusually good simultaneous rational approximations with a common denominator, measured multiplicatively rather than by the maximum of the two errors.

A real number $\alpha$ is badly approximable if
$$\inf_{n\geq1}n\|n\alpha\|>0.$$
For an irrational number, this is equivalent to its continued fraction having bounded partial quotients. If $\alpha$ is not badly approximable, then
$$0\leq n\|n\alpha\|\|n\beta\|
\leq \tfrac12 n\|n\alpha\|,$$
so the conjecture follows immediately; the same argument applies with $\alpha$ and $\beta$ interchanged. The conjecture also holds when $1,\alpha,\beta$ are linearly dependent over $\mathbb Q$.

== Reformulations ==
=== Product of three linear forms ===
Define the cubic form
$$L_{\alpha,\beta}(x,y,z)
=x(\alpha x-y)(\beta x-z).$$
Since $\|n\alpha\|$ and $\|n\beta\|$ are obtained by choosing the nearest integers $y$ and $z$, Littlewood's conjecture is equivalent to
$$\inf_{(x,y,z)\in\mathbb Z^3,\,x\ne0}
|L_{\alpha,\beta}(x,y,z)|=0.$$
This formulation places the problem in the geometry of numbers and in the study of products of linear forms.

=== Diagonal actions on lattices ===
The dynamical formulation uses the space
$$X_3=\operatorname{SL}(3,\mathbb R)/\operatorname{SL}(3,\mathbb Z)$$
of unimodular lattices in $\mathbb R^3$. Associate to $(\alpha,\beta)$ the lattice
$$x_{\alpha,\beta}=
\begin{pmatrix}
1&0&0\\
\alpha&1&0\\
\beta&0&1
\end{pmatrix}\mathbb Z^3.$$
The integer vector $(n,-p,-q)$ becomes
$$(n,\;n\alpha-p,\;n\beta-q).$$
The product of these three coordinates is invariant under determinant-one diagonal transformations. By Mahler's compactness theorem, failure of Littlewood's conjecture corresponds to relative compactness of the orbit of $x_{\alpha,\beta}$ under an appropriate positive semigroup in the diagonal group. This connection permits the use of ergodic theory and homogeneous dynamics.

== Related conjectures ==
=== Cassels–Swinnerton-Dyer conjecture ===
Work of Cassels and Swinnerton-Dyer led to a broader conjecture about products of linear forms. Let
$$L(\mathbf x)=L_1(\mathbf x)L_2(\mathbf x)\cdots L_d(\mathbf x)$$
be a product of $d\geq3$ linearly independent real linear forms in $d$ variables. If $L$ is not a nonzero constant multiple of a form with integer coefficients, the conjecture asserts that
$$\inf_{\mathbf x\in\mathbb Z^d\setminus\{\mathbf{0}\}}
|L(\mathbf x)|=0.$$
Cassels and Swinnerton-Dyer showed that the case $d=3$ of this conjecture would imply Littlewood's conjecture.

=== Compact diagonal orbits ===
Let $D_d$ be the group of positive diagonal matrices of determinant one acting on
$$X_d=\operatorname{SL}(d,\mathbb R)/\operatorname{SL}(d,\mathbb Z).$$
The compact-orbit conjecture states that every relatively compact $D_d$-orbit in $X_d$ is closed. This is the standard dynamical reformulation of the Cassels–Swinnerton-Dyer conjecture; the case $d=3$ would imply Littlewood's conjecture.

=== Disproved broader orbit-closure conjecture ===
Margulis also proposed a substantially broader description of orbit closures for actions of connected subgroups generated by real-split elements. In that formulation, an orbit closure was expected either to be homogeneous or to arise through a factor on which the acting group becomes a one-parameter non-unipotent group.

This general conjecture is false. In 2010, François Maucourant constructed, for $G=\operatorname{SL}(d,\mathbb R)$ with $d\geq6$, lattices $\Gamma\subset G$, subgroups $A$ of the diagonal group, and points $x\in G/\Gamma$ for which $\overline{Ax}$ is not homogeneous and the action does not factor through a one-parameter non-unipotent group. These counterexamples concern subgroups of diagonal groups in dimensions at least six. They do not disprove the compact-orbit conjecture for the full diagonal group in dimension three and therefore do not settle Littlewood's conjecture.

== Partial results ==
=== Metric and dimension results ===
Gallagher proved that, for almost every pair $(\alpha,\beta)$,
$$\liminf_{n\to\infty}
n(\log n)^2\|n\alpha\|\|n\beta\|=0.$$
This strengthens Littlewood's conjecture by two logarithmic factors for a full-measure set of pairs.

Einsiedler, Katok and Lindenstrauss proved that the exceptional set
$$\mathcal E=
\left\{(\alpha,\beta)\in\mathbb R^2:
\liminf_{n\to\infty}n\|n\alpha\|\|n\beta\|>0
\right\}$$
has Hausdorff dimension zero. Their proof combines entropy and measure rigidity for higher-rank diagonal actions. It does not show that $\mathcal E$ is empty.

Metric results have also been proved on lower-dimensional subsets. In 2024, Sam Chow and Lei Yang established a two-logarithm strengthening for almost every point on any line in the plane, using effective equidistribution of one-parameter unipotent orbits in $X_3$.

=== Algebraic and explicit pairs ===
Cassels and Swinnerton-Dyer proved the conjecture when $1,\alpha,\beta$ span a totally real cubic number field. Uri Shapira later proved a stronger, fully inhomogeneous statement for the same class of pairs.

Several results construct large or explicit families inside $\operatorname{Bad}\times\operatorname{Bad}$, where $\operatorname{Bad}$ denotes the badly approximable numbers. For every fixed $\alpha\in\operatorname{Bad}$, Andrew Pollington and Sanju Velani constructed a subset of $\beta\in\operatorname{Bad}$ of Hausdorff dimension 1 such that
$$n\|n\alpha\|\|n\beta\|\leq\frac1{\log n}$$
for infinitely many $n$.

Bernard de Mathan gave effective constructions of linearly independent pairs with bounded partial quotients satisfying the conjecture. Boris Adamczewski and Yann Bugeaud proved that, for every fixed real $\alpha$ with bounded partial quotients, one can explicitly construct continuum many $\beta$ with bounded partial quotients for which a strong form of Littlewood's conjecture holds.

=== Limits of quantitative strengthening ===
Gallagher's theorem is an almost-everywhere result and cannot be promoted to a comparable assertion for every pair. Bugeaud and Nikolay Moshchevitin proved that the set of pairs satisfying
$$\liminf_{n\to\infty}
n(\log n)^2\|n\alpha\|\|n\beta\|>0$$
has full Hausdorff dimension in $\mathbb R^2$. Dzmitry Badziahin strengthened this by showing that the set of pairs for which
$$\liminf_{n\to\infty}
n\log n\log\log n\,
\|n\alpha\|\|n\beta\|>0$$
has full Hausdorff dimension. These full-dimensional sets have Lebesgue measure zero, so the results are compatible with Gallagher's theorem.

In 2026, Reynold Fregoli and Dmitry Kleinbock generalized Badziahin's logarithmic obstruction to vectors in $\mathbb R^d$, replacing $\log n\log\log n$ by $(\log n)^{d-1}\log\log n$.

== Inhomogeneous and fibre versions ==
An inhomogeneous version introduces fixed shifts $\gamma,\delta\in\mathbb R$ and asks about
$$\liminf_{|n|\to\infty}
|n|\,\|n\alpha-\gamma\|\,\|n\beta-\delta\|.$$
Shapira proved that almost every pair $(\alpha,\beta)$ satisfies
$$\forall\gamma,\delta\in\mathbb R,\qquad
\liminf_{|n|\to\infty}
|n|\,\|n\alpha-\gamma\|\,\|n\beta-\delta\|=0.$$
He also proved this uniform inhomogeneous statement whenever $1,\alpha,\beta$ span a totally real cubic number field.

Strong inhomogeneous results have also been obtained along fibres. Chow and Agamemnon Zafeiropoulos proved such a result on a full-dimensional set of pairs of badly approximable numbers on a vertical line.

In 2024, Chow and Niclas Technau constructed an explicit full-measure set of $\alpha$ such that, for every $\gamma$, for almost every $\beta$, and for every $\delta$, there are infinitely many $n$ satisfying
$$n\|n\alpha-\gamma\|\|n\beta-\delta\|
<\frac{(\log\log n)^{3+\varepsilon}}{\log n}$$
for every fixed $\varepsilon>0$. Eduard Stefanescu subsequently sharpened dispersion estimates for dilated lacunary sequences and obtained corresponding improvements in inhomogeneous multiplicative approximation.

== Numerical investigations ==
For a pair $(\alpha,\beta)$, define
$$m(\alpha,\beta)
=\inf_{n\geq1}n\|n\alpha\|\|n\beta\|,
\qquad
m_{\mathrm{LC}}
=\sup_{\alpha,\beta\in\mathbb R}m(\alpha,\beta).$$
Littlewood's conjecture is equivalent to $m_{\mathrm{LC}}=0$. Numerical work seeks rigorous universal upper bounds for $m_{\mathrm{LC}}$; a positive upper bound does not by itself prove the conjecture.

In 2016, Badziahin gave an algorithm for certifying inequalities of the form $m_{\mathrm{LC}}<\varepsilon$ and used it to prove
$$m_{\mathrm{LC}}<\frac1{19}.$$
In 2026, Tapani Matala-Aho, Topi Törmä and Matti Vapa introduced another algorithm, based on the simple continued-fraction expansions of $\alpha$ and $\beta$, for checking proposed universal upper bounds and used it to obtain a further universal estimate.

== Variants ==
=== The $p$-adic Littlewood conjecture ===
In 2004, de Mathan and Olivier Teulié proposed a mixed real and $p$-adic analogue. For a prime $p$, it asks whether
$$\inf_{n\geq1}n\,|n|_p\,\|n\alpha\|=0$$
for every real number $\alpha$, where $|n|_p=p^{-v_p(n)}$ is the $p$-adic absolute value. They proved the assertion for quadratic irrational numbers. The conjecture remains open in general. Einsiedler and Dmitry Kleinbock proved that exceptional sets for several $p$-adic Littlewood-type problems have Hausdorff dimension zero.

=== Function-field analogues ===
Analogues over fields of formal Laurent series behave differently from the classical real conjecture. Faustin Adiceam, Erez Nesharim and Fred Lunnon constructed an explicit counterexample to the $t$-adic analogue over finite fields of characteristic 3. Samuel Garrett and Steven Robertson later produced counterexamples to the $P(t)$-adic analogue in characteristic 5 and proved that the characteristic-3 construction also works in characteristics 7 and 11.

Robertson subsequently proved a transference principle from the $t$-adic problem to analogues associated with arbitrary irreducible polynomials $P(t)$ and developed a general framework using number walls, infinite arrays of Toeplitz determinants that translate approximation questions into combinatorial ones. These counterexamples do not affect the classical conjecture over the real numbers.

== See also ==
- Badly approximable number
- Homogeneous dynamics
- Oppenheim conjecture
- Schmidt's game
