= Littlewood's 4/3 inequality =

In mathematical analysis, Littlewood's 4/3 inequality, named after John Edensor Littlewood, is an inequality that holds for every complex-valued bilinear form defined on $c_0$, the Banach space of scalar sequences that converge to zero.

Precisely, let $B:c_0\times c_0 \to \mathbb{C}$ or $\mathbb{R}$ be a bilinear form. Then the following holds:

$$\left( \sum_{i,j=1}^\infty |B(e_i,e_j)|^{4/3} \right)^{3/4} \le \sqrt{2} \| B \|,$$

where

$$\| B \| = \sup \{|B(x_1,x_2)|: \|x_i\|_\infty \le 1 \}.$$

The exponent 4/3 is optimal, i.e., cannot be improved by a smaller exponent. It is also known that for real scalars the aforementioned constant is sharp.

== Generalizations ==
=== Bohnenblust–Hille inequality ===
Bohnenblust–Hille inequality is a multilinear extension of Littlewood's inequality that states that for all $m$-linear mapping $M : c_0\times \cdots \times c_0 \to \mathbb{C}$ the following holds:

$$\left( \sum_{i_1,\ldots,i_m=1}^\infty |M(e_{i_1},\ldots,e_{i_m})|^{2m/(m+1)} \right)^{(m+1)/(2m)} \le 2^{(m-1)/2} \| M \|,$$

== See also ==
- Grothendieck inequality
