= Littlewood–Offord problem =

Mathematical combinatorial geometry problem

In the mathematical field of combinatorial geometry, the Littlewood–Offord problem is the problem of determining the number of subsums of a set of vectors that fall in a given convex set. More formally, if V is a vector space of dimension d, the problem is to determine, given a finite subset of vectors S and a convex subset A, the number of subsets of S whose summation is in A.

The first upper bound for this problem was proven (for d = 1 and d = 2) in 1938 by John Edensor Littlewood and A. Cyril Offord. This Littlewood–Offord lemma states that if S is a set of n real or complex numbers of absolute value at least one and A is any disc of diameter r, then not more than $cr2^n (\log n) n^{-1/2}$ of the 2^{n} possible subsums of S fall into the disc.

In 1945 Paul Erdős improved the upper bound for d = 1 and r = 1 to

$${n \choose \lfloor{n/2}\rfloor} \approx 2^n \, \frac{1}{\sqrt{n}}$$

using Sperner's theorem. This bound is sharp; equality is attained when all vectors in S are equal. In 1966, Kleitman showed that the same bound held for complex numbers. In 1970, he extended this to the setting when V is a normed space.

Suppose S = {v_{1}, …, v_{n}}. By subtracting

$$\frac{1}{2} \sum_{i = 1}^n v_i$$

from each possible subsum (that is, by changing the origin and then scaling by a factor of 2), the Littlewood–Offord problem is equivalent to the problem of determining the number of sums of the form

$$\sum_{i = 1}^n \varepsilon_i v_i$$

that fall in the target set A, where $\varepsilon_i$ takes the value $\frac{1}{2}$ or $-\frac{1}{2}$. This makes the problem into a probabilistic one, in which the question is of the distribution of these random vectors, and what can be said knowing nothing more about the v_{i}.

If the $\varepsilon_i$'s take values from 1 or -1, instead of $\frac{1}{2}$ or $-\frac{1}{2}$, the target set A for the Littlewood-Offord lemma can be changed from a disk of diameter one to a disk of radius one to account for the doubling of the coefficients.
