= Littlewood's three principles of real analysis =

Heuristics in measure theory

Littlewood's three principles of real analysis are heuristics of J. E. Littlewood to help teach the essentials of measure theory in mathematical analysis.

== The Principles ==
Littlewood stated the principles in his 1944 Lectures on the Theory of Functions as:

There are three principles, roughly expressible in the following terms: Every (measurable) set is nearly a finite sum of intervals; every function (of class L^{p}) is nearly continuous; every convergent sequence of functions is nearly uniformly convergent.

The first principle is based on the fact that the inner measure and outer measure are equal for measurable sets, the second is based on Lusin's theorem, and the third is based on Egorov's theorem.

== Example ==
Littlewood's three principles are quoted in several real analysis texts, for example Royden, Bressoud, and Stein & Shakarchi.

Royden gives the bounded convergence theorem as an application of the third principle. The theorem states that if a uniformly bounded sequence of functions converges pointwise, then their integrals on a set of finite measure converge to the integral of the limit function. If the convergence were uniform this would be a trivial result, and Littlewood's third principle tells us that the convergence is almost uniform, that is, uniform outside of a set of arbitrarily small measure. Because the sequence is bounded, the contribution to the integrals of the small set can be made arbitrarily small, and the integrals on the remainder converge because the functions are uniformly convergent there.
