= Littlewood's Tauberian theorem =

In mathematics, Littlewood's Tauberian theorem is a strengthening of Tauber's theorem introduced by John Edensor Littlewood (1911).

== Statement ==
Littlewood showed the following: If a_{n} = O(1/n ), and as x ↑ 1 we have

$$\sum a_n x^n \to s,$$

then

$$\sum a_n = s.$$

Hardy and Littlewood later showed that the hypothesis on a_{n} could be weakened to the "one-sided" condition a_{n} ≥ –C/n for some constant C. However in some sense the condition is optimal: Littlewood showed that if c_{n} is any unbounded sequence then there is a series with |a_{n}| ≤ |c_{n}|/n which is divergent but Abel summable.

== History ==
Littlewood (1953) described his discovery of the proof of his Tauberian theorem. Alfred Tauber's original theorem was similar to Littlewood's, but with the stronger hypothesis that a_{n}=o(1/n). Hardy had proved a similar theorem for Cesàro summation with the weaker hypothesis a_{n}=O(1/n), and suggested to Littlewood that the same weaker hypothesis might also be enough for Tauber's theorem. In spite of the fact that the hypothesis in Littlewood's theorem seems only slightly weaker than the hypothesis in Tauber's theorem, Littlewood's proof was far harder than Tauber's, though Jovan Karamata later found an easier proof.

Littlewood's theorem follows from the later Hardy–Littlewood Tauberian theorem, which is in turn a special case of Wiener's Tauberian theorem, which itself is a special case of various abstract Tauberian theorems about Banach algebras.
