= First Hardy–Littlewood conjecture =

Unanswered conjecture in number theory

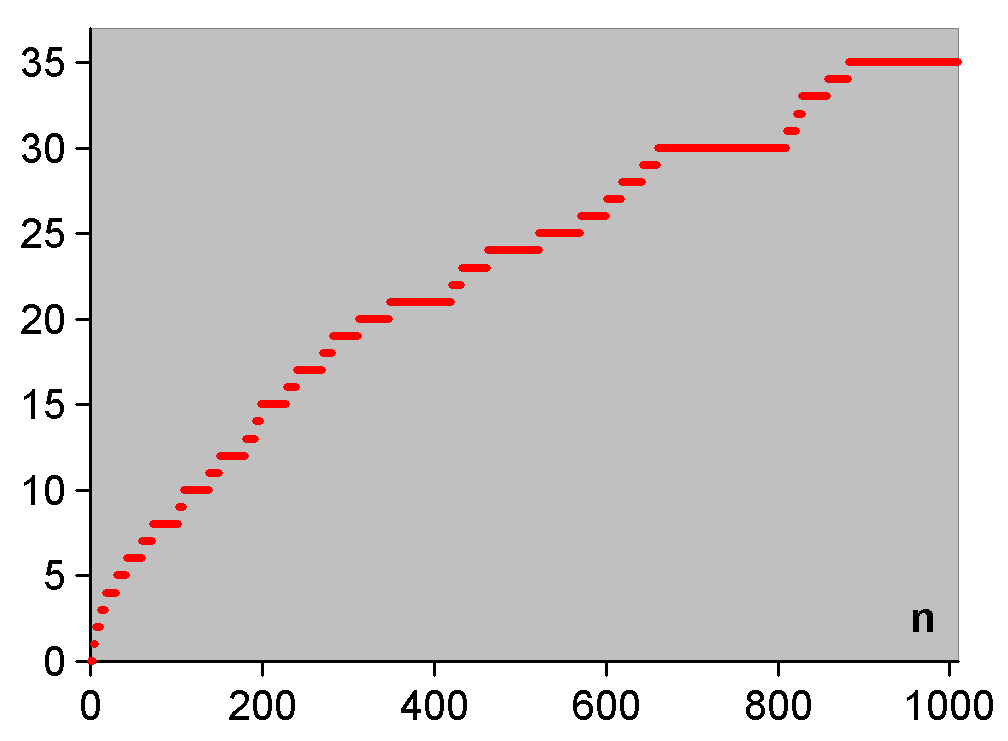
- Plot showing the number of twin primes less than a given n. The first Hardy–Littlewood conjecture predicts there are infinitely many of these.
- Field: Number theory
- Conjectured by: G. H. Hardy; John Edensor Littlewood
- Conjectured in: 1923
- Open problem: yes

In number theory, the first Hardy–Littlewood conjecture states the asymptotic formula for the number of prime k-tuples less than a given magnitude by generalizing the prime number theorem. It was first proposed by G. H. Hardy and J. E. Littlewood in 1923.

== Statement ==
Let $m_1, m_2, \ldots, m_k$ be positive even integers such that the numbers of the sequence $P = (p, p + m_1, p + m_2, \ldots , p + m_k)$ do not form a complete residue class with respect to any prime and let $\pi_{P}(n)$ denote the number of primes $p$ less than $n$ so that $p + m_1, p + m_2, \ldots , p + m_k$ are all prime. Then

$$\pi_P(n)\sim C_P\int_2^n \frac{dt}{\log^{k+1}t},$$

where

$$C_P=2^k \prod_{q \text{ prime,} \atop q \ge 3}\frac{1-\frac{w(q; m_1, m_2, \ldots , m_k)}q}{\left(1-\frac{1}{q}\right)^{k+1}}$$

is a product over odd primes and $w(q; m_1, m_2, \ldots , m_k)$ denotes the number of distinct residues of $0, m_1, m_2, \ldots , m_k$ modulo $q$.

The case $k=1$ and $m_1=2$ is related to the twin prime conjecture. Specifically if $\pi_2(n)$ denotes the number of twin primes less than n then

$$\pi_2(n)\sim C_2 \int_2^n \frac{dt}{\log^2 t},$$

where

$$C_2 = 2\prod_{\textstyle{q \text{ prime,}\atop q \ge 3}} \left(1 - \frac{1}{(q-1)^2} \right) \approx  1.320323632\ldots$$

is the twin prime constant.

== Skewes' number ==
The Skewes' numbers for prime k-tuples are an extension of the definition of Skewes' number to prime k-tuples based on the first Hardy–Littlewood conjecture. The first prime p that violates the Hardy–Littlewood inequality for the k-tuple P, i.e., such that

$$\pi_P(p)>C_P \operatorname {li}_P(p),$$

(if such a prime exists) is the Skewes number for P.

== Consequences ==
The conjecture has been shown to be inconsistent with the second Hardy–Littlewood conjecture.

== Generalizations ==
The Bateman–Horn conjecture generalizes the first Hardy–Littlewood conjecture to polynomials of degree higher than 1.
