= Littlewood subordination theorem =

Mathematics theorem

In mathematics, the Littlewood subordination theorem, proved by J. E. Littlewood in 1925, is a theorem in operator theory and complex analysis. It states that any holomorphic univalent self-mapping of the unit disk in the complex numbers that fixes 0 induces a contractive composition operator on various function spaces of holomorphic functions on the disk. These spaces include the Hardy spaces, the Bergman spaces and Dirichlet space.

== Subordination theorem ==
Let h be a holomorphic univalent mapping of the unit disk D into itself such that h(0) = 0. Then the composition operator C_{h} defined on holomorphic functions f on D by

$$C_h(f) = f\circ h$$

defines a linear operator with operator norm less than 1 on the Hardy spaces $H^p(D)$, the Bergman spaces $A^p(D)$. (1 ≤ p < ∞) and the Dirichlet space $\mathcal{D}(D)$.

The norms on these spaces are defined by:

$$\|f\|_{H^p}^p = \sup_r {1\over 2\pi}\int_0^{2\pi} |f(re^{i\theta})|^p \, d\theta$$

$$\|f\|_{A^p}^p = {1\over \pi} \iint_D |f(z)|^p\, dx\,dy$$

$$\|f\|_{\mathcal D}^2 = {1\over  \pi} \iint_D |f^\prime(z)|^2\, dx\,dy= {1\over 4 \pi} \iint_D |\partial_x f|^2 + |\partial_y f|^2\, dx\,dy$$

== Littlewood's inequalities ==
Let f be a holomorphic function on the unit disk D and let h be a holomorphic univalent mapping of D into itself with h(0) = 0. Then if 0 < r < 1 and 1 ≤ p < ∞

$$\int_0^{2\pi} |f(h(re^{i\theta}))|^p \, d\theta \le \int_0^{2\pi} |f(re^{i\theta})|^p \, d\theta.$$

This inequality also holds for 0 < p < 1, although in this case there is no operator interpretation.

== Proofs ==
=== Case p = 2 ===
To prove the result for H^{2} it suffices to show that for f a polynomial

$$\displaystyle{\|C_h f\|^2 \le \|f\|^2,}$$

Let U be the unilateral shift defined by

$$\displaystyle{Uf(z)= zf(z)}.$$

This has adjoint U* given by

$$U^*f(z) ={f(z)-f(0)\over z}.$$

Since f(0) = a_{0}, this gives

$$f= a_0 + zU^*f$$

and hence

$$C_h f = a_0 + h C_hU^*f.$$

Thus

$$\|C_h f\|^2 = |a_0|^2 + \|hC_hU^*f\|^2 \le |a_0^2|+ \|C_h U^*f\|^2.$$

Since U*f has degree less than f, it follows by induction that

$$\|C_h U^*f\|^2 \le \|U^*f\|^2 = \|f\|^2 - |a_0|^2,$$

and hence

$$\|C_h f\|^2 \le  \|f\|^2.$$

The same method of proof works for A^{2} and $\mathcal D.$

=== General Hardy spaces ===
If f is in Hardy space H^{p}, then it has a factorization

$$f(z) = f_i(z)f_o(z)$$

with f_{i} an inner function and f_{o} an outer function.

Then

$$\|C_h f\|_{H^p} \le \|(C_hf_i) (C_h f_o)\|_{H^p} \le \|C_h f_o\|_{H^p} \le \|C_h f_o^{p/2}\|_{H^2}^{2/p} \le \|f\|_{H^p}.$$

=== Inequalities ===
Taking 0 < r < 1, Littlewood's inequalities follow by applying the Hardy space inequalities to the function

$$f_r(z)=f(rz).$$

The inequalities can also be deduced, following Riesz (1925), using subharmonic functions. The inequaties in turn immediately imply the subordination theorem for general Bergman spaces.
