= Edriss Titi =

Palestinian-Israeli mathematician (born 1957)

- إدريس صالح تيتي
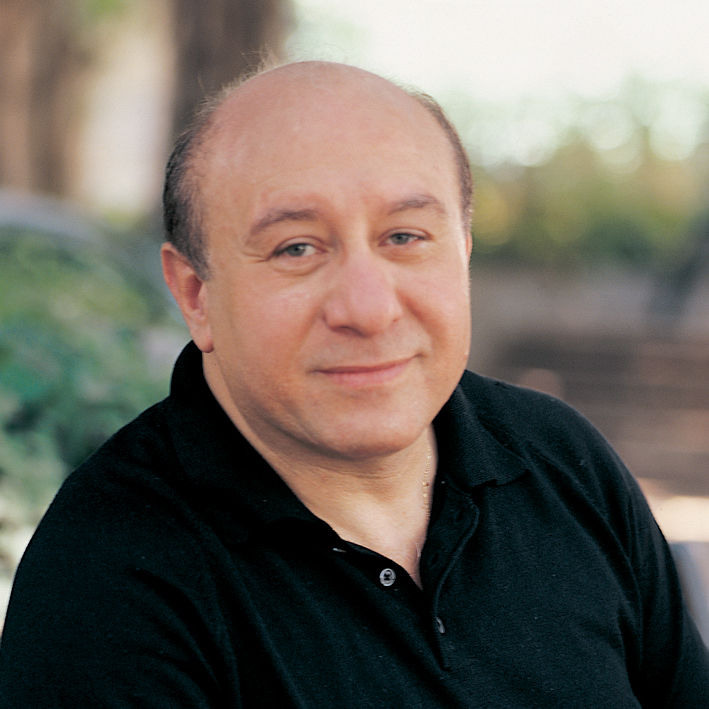
- Born: March 22, 1957 (age 69); Acre, Israel
- Citizenship: Israel, United States
- Awards: Humboldt Research Award (2009); Guggenheim Fellowship (2018)
- Scientific career
- Fields: Nonlinear partial differential equations, fluid dynamics
- Doctoral advisor: Ciprian Foias

Edriss Saleh Titi (Arabic: إدريس صالح تيتي, Hebrew: אדריס סאלח תיתי; born 22 March 1957 in Acre, Israel) is an Arab-Israeli mathematician.

== Academic career ==
Edriss Saleh Titi is Professor of Nonlinear Mathematical Science at the University of Cambridge. He also holds the Arthur Owen Professorship of Mathematics at Texas A&M University, and serves as Professor of Computer Science and Applied Mathematics at the Weizmann Institute of Science and Professor Emeritus at the University of California, Irvine.

== Published works ==
- Cao, Chongsheng; Titi, Edriss S. (2007). "Global well-posedness of the three-dimensional viscous primitive equations of large scale ocean and atmosphere dynamics". Annals of Mathematics. 166. Princeton University Press: 245–267. arXiv:math/0503028. doi:10.4007/annals.2007.166.245. S2CID 12690494.
- Foias, Ciprian; Holm, Darryl D.; Titi, Edriss S. (2002). "The three dimensional viscous Camassa–Holm equations, and their relation to the Navier–Stokes equations and turbulence theory". Journal of Dynamics and Differential Equations. 14 (14): 1–35. arXiv:nlin/0103039. doi:10.1023/A:1012984210582. S2CID 16616840.
- Foias, Ciprian; Holm, Darryl D.; Titi, Edriss S. (2001). "The Navier–Stokes-alpha model of fluid turbulence". Physica D: Nonlinear Phenomena. 152. North-Holland: 505–519. arXiv:nlin/0103037. Bibcode:2001PhyD..152..505F. doi:10.1016/S0167-2789(01)00191-9. S2CID 9174030.
- Titi, Edriss S. (1990). "On approximate inertial manifolds to the Navier-Stokes equations". Journal of Mathematical Analysis and Applications. 149 (2). Academic Press: 540–557. doi:10.1016/0022-247X(90)90061-J.
