= John Edensor Littlewood =

British mathematician (1885–1977)

John E. Littlewood FRS
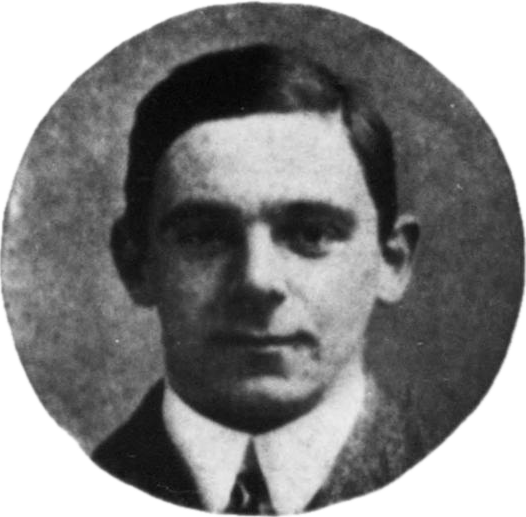
- Littlewood in 1905
- Born: John Edensor Littlewood; 9 June 1885; Rochester, Kent, England
- Died: 6 September 1977 (aged 92); Cambridge, England
- Education: Trinity College, Cambridge
- Known for: Mathematical analysis
- Awards: Smith's Prize (1908); Royal Medal (1929); De Morgan Medal (1938); Sylvester Medal (1943); Copley Medal (1958); Senior Berwick Prize (1960)
- Scientific career
- Fields: Mathematics
- Workplaces: University of Cambridge
- Doctoral advisor: Ernest Barnes
- Doctoral students: A. O. L. Atkin; Sarvadaman Chowla; Harold Davenport; Srinivasa Ramanujan; Stanley Skewes; Donald C. Spencer; Albert Ingham

John Edensor Littlewood (9 June 1885 – 6 September 1977) was a British mathematician. He worked on topics relating to analysis, number theory, and differential equations and had lengthy collaborations with G. H. Hardy, Srinivasa Ramanujan and Mary Cartwright.

== Biography ==
Littlewood was born on the 9th of June 1885 in Rochester, Kent, the eldest son of Edward Thornton Littlewood and Sylvia Maud (née Ackland). In 1892, his father accepted the headmastership of a school in Wynberg, Cape Town, in South Africa, taking his family there. Littlewood returned to Britain in 1900 to attend St Paul's School in London, studying under Francis Sowerby Macaulay, an influential algebraic geometer.

In 1903, Littlewood entered the University of Cambridge, studying in Trinity College. He spent his first two years preparing for the Tripos examinations which qualify undergraduates for a bachelor's degree where he emerged in 1905 as Senior Wrangler bracketed with James Mercer (Mercer had already graduated from the University of Manchester before attending Cambridge). In 1906, after completing the second part of the Tripos, he started his research under Ernest Barnes. One of the problems that Barnes suggested to Littlewood was to prove the Riemann hypothesis, an assignment at which he did not succeed. He was elected a fellow of Trinity College in 1908. From October 1907 to June 1910, he worked as a Richardson Lecturer in the School of Mathematics at the University of Manchester. He was elected to the membership of Manchester Literary and Philosophical Society on 14 January 1908.

He returned to Cambridge in October 1910, where he remained for the rest of his career. He was appointed Rouse Ball professor of mathematics in 1928, retiring in 1950. He was elected a fellow of the Royal Society in 1916, awarded the Royal Medal in 1929, the Sylvester Medal in 1943, and the Copley Medal in 1958. He was president of the London Mathematical Society from 1941 to 1943 and was awarded the De Morgan Medal in 1938 and the Senior Berwick Prize in 1960.

Littlewood died on 6 September 1977.

== Work ==
Most of Littlewood's work was in the field of mathematical analysis. He began research under the supervision of Ernest William Barnes, who suggested that he attempt to prove the Riemann hypothesis: Littlewood showed that if the Riemann hypothesis is true, then the prime number theorem follows and obtained the error term. This work won him his Trinity fellowship. However, the link between the Riemann hypothesis and the prime number theorem had been known before in Continental Europe, and Littlewood wrote later in his book, A Mathematician's Miscellany that his rediscovery of the result did not shed a positive light on the isolated nature of British mathematics at the time.

=== Theory of the distribution of prime numbers ===
In 1914, Littlewood published his first result in the field of analytic number theory concerning the error term of the prime-counting function. If $\pi(x)$ denotes the number of primes up $x$, then the prime number theorem implies that $\pi(x)\sim\operatorname{Li}(x)$, where $\operatorname{Li}(x)$ is the offset logarithmic integral. Numerical evidence seemed to suggest that $\pi(x)<\operatorname{Li}(x)$ for all $x$. Littlewood, however proved that the difference $\pi(x)-\operatorname{Li}(x)$ changes sign infinitely often.

=== Collaboration with G. H. Hardy ===
Littlewood collaborated for many years with G. H. Hardy. Together they devised the first Hardy–Littlewood conjecture, a strong form of the twin prime conjecture, and the second Hardy–Littlewood conjecture.

==== Ramanujan ====
He also, with Hardy, identified the work of the Indian mathematician Srinivasa Ramanujan as that of a genius and supported him in travelling from India to work at Cambridge. A self-taught mathematician, Ramanujan later became a Fellow of the Royal Society, Fellow of Trinity College, Cambridge, and widely recognised as on a par with other geniuses such as Euler and Jacobi.

=== Collaboration with Mary Cartwright ===
In the late 1930s, as the prospect of war loomed, the Department of Scientific and Industrial Research sought the interest of pure mathematicians in the properties of nonlinear differential equations that were needed by radio engineers and scientists. The problems appealed to Littlewood and Mary Cartwright, and they worked on them independently during the next 20 years.

The problems that Littlewood and Cartwright worked on concerned differential equations arising out of early research on radar: their work foreshadowed the modern theory of dynamical systems. Littlewood's 4/3 inequality on bilinear forms was a forerunner of the later Grothendieck tensor norm theory.

== Military service WWI – ballistics work ==
During the Great War, Littlewood served in the Royal Garrison Artillery as a second lieutenant. He made highly significant contributions in the field of ballistics.

== Later life ==
He continued to write papers into his eighties, particularly in analytical areas of what would become the theory of dynamical systems.

Littlewood is also remembered for his book of reminiscences, A Mathematician's Miscellany (new edition published in 1986).

Among his PhD students were Sarvadaman Chowla, Harold Davenport, and Donald C. Spencer. Spencer reported that in 1941 when he (Spencer) was about to get on the boat that would take him home to the United States, Littlewood reminded him: "n, n alpha, n beta!" (referring to Littlewood's conjecture).

Littlewood's collaborative work, carried out by correspondence, covered fields in Diophantine approximation and Waring's problem, in particular. In his other work, he collaborated with Raymond Paley on Littlewood–Paley theory in Fourier theory, and with Cyril Offord in combinatorial work on random sums, in developments that opened up fields that are still intensively studied.

In a 1947 lecture, the Danish mathematician Harald Bohr said, "To illustrate to what extent Hardy and Littlewood in the course of the years came to be considered as the leaders of recent English mathematical research, I may report what an excellent colleague once jokingly said: 'Nowadays, there are only three really great English mathematicians: Hardy, Littlewood, and Hardy–Littlewood.' "

The German mathematician Edmund Landau supposed that Littlewood was a pseudonym that Hardy used for his lesser work and "so doubted the existence of Littlewood that he made a special trip to Great Britain to see the man with his own eyes". He visited Cambridge where he saw much of Hardy but nothing of Littlewood and so considered his conjecture to be proven. A similar story was told about Norbert Wiener, who vehemently denied it in his autobiography.

He coined Littlewood's law, which states that individuals can expect "miracles" to happen to them at the rate of about one per month.

== Cultural references ==
John Littlewood is depicted in two films covering the life of Ramanujan – Ramanujan in 2014 portrayed by Michael Lieber and The Man Who Knew Infinity in 2015 portrayed by Toby Jones.

== See also ==
- Critical line theorem
- Littlewood conjecture
- Littlewood polynomial
- Littlewood's three principles of real analysis
- Littlewood's Tauberian theorem
- Littlewood's 4/3 inequality
- Littlewood subordination theorem
- Littlewood–Offord problem
- Littlewood–Paley theory
- Hardy–Littlewood circle method
- Hardy–Littlewood definition
- Hardy–Littlewood inequality
- Hardy–Littlewood maximal function
- Hardy–Littlewood zeta function conjectures
- Hardy–Littlewood tauberian theorem
- First Hardy–Littlewood conjecture
- Second Hardy–Littlewood conjecture
- Ross–Littlewood paradox
- Hadamard three-circle theorem
- Skewes's number

Awards and achievements
Preceded by Arthur Stanley Eddington and Robert Broom	Royal Medal (with Robert Muir); 1929	Succeeded by John Edward Marr and Owen Willans Richardson
Preceded by E. T. Whittaker	De Morgan Medal; 1938	Succeeded by Louis Mordell
Preceded by Godfrey Harold Hardy	Sylvester Medal; 1943	Succeeded by George Neville Watson
Preceded by Howard Florey	Copley Medal; 1958	Succeeded by Frank Macfarlane Burnet
