= Daniel Goldston =

American mathematician

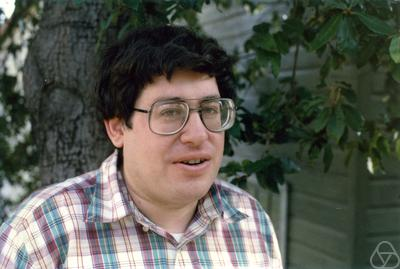
- Born: January 4, 1954 (age 72); Oakland, California, US
- Education: University of California, Berkeley
- Known for: GPY theorem in number theory
- Awards: Cole Prize (2014)
- Scientific career
- Fields: Mathematics
- Workplaces: San Jose State University
- Thesis: Large differences between consecutive prime numbers (1981)
- Doctoral advisor: Russell Lehman

Daniel Alan Goldston (born January 4, 1954) is an American mathematician who specializes in number theory. He is currently a professor of mathematics at San Jose State University.

== Early life and education ==
Daniel Alan Goldston was born on January 4, 1954, in Oakland, California. In 1972, he matriculated to the University of California, Berkeley, where he earned his bachelor's degree and, in 1981, a Ph.D. in mathematics. His doctoral advisor at Berkeley was Russell Sherman Lehman; his dissertation was entitled "Large Differences between Consecutive Prime Numbers".

== Career ==
After earning his doctorate, Goldston worked at the University of Minnesota Duluth and then spent the next academic year (1982–83) at the Institute for Advanced Study (IAS) in Princeton. He has worked at San Jose State University since 1983, save for stints at the IAS (1990), the University of Toronto (1994), and the Mathematical Sciences Research Institute in Berkeley (1999).

== Research ==
In 2009, Goldston, János Pintz, and Cem Yıldırım proved: $\liminf_{n\to\infty}\frac{p_{n+1}-p_n}{\log p_n}=0$

where $p_n$ denotes the n^{th} prime number. In other words, for every $c>0\$, there exist infinitely many pairs of consecutive primes $p_n\$ and that $p_{n+1}\$ are closer to each other than the average distance between consecutive primes by a factor of $c\$, i.e., $p_{n+1}-p_n<c\log p_n\$. This result was originally reported in 2003 by Goldston and Yıldırım but was later retracted. Then Pintz joined the team and they completed the proof with the GPY sieve.

== Recognition ==
In 2014, Goldston won the Cole Prize, shared with Yitang Zhang and colleagues Cem Yıldırım and János Pintz, for his contributions to number theory. Also, Goldston was named to the 2021 class of fellows of the American Mathematical Society "for contributions to analytic number theory".

== See also ==
- Landau's problems
- Yitang Zhang
- James Maynard (mathematician)
