= János Pintz =

Hungarian mathematician

János Pintz (Hungarian pronunciation: [ˈjaːnoʃ ˈpints]; born 20 December 1950) is a Hungarian mathematician working in analytic number theory. He is a fellow of the Rényi Mathematical Institute and is also a member of the Hungarian Academy of Sciences. In 2014, he received the Cole Prize of the American Mathematical Society.

== Mathematical results ==
Pintz is best known for proving in 2005 (with Daniel Goldston and Cem Yıldırım) that

$$\liminf_{n\to\infty}\frac{p_{n+1}-p_n}{\log p_n}=0$$

where $p_n$ denotes the n^{th} prime number. In other words, for every ε > 0, there exist infinitely many pairs of consecutive primes p_{n} and p_{n+1} that are closer to each other than the average distance between consecutive primes by a factor of ε, i.e., p_{n+1} − p_{n} < ε log p_{n}. This result was originally reported in 2003 by Daniel Goldston and Cem Yıldırım but was later retracted. Pintz joined the team and completed the proof in 2005 and developed the so-called GPY sieve. Later, they improved this to showing that p_{n+1} − p_{n} < ε√log n(log log n)^{2} occurs infinitely often. Further, if one assumes the Elliott–Halberstam conjecture, then one can also show that primes within 16 of each other occur infinitely often, which is nearly the twin prime conjecture.

Additionally,

- With János Komlós and Endre Szemerédi, he disproved the Heilbronn conjecture.
- With Iwaniec, he proved that for sufficiently large n there is a prime between n and n + n^{23/42}.
- Pintz gave an effective upper bound for the first number for which the Mertens conjecture fails.
- He gave an O(x^{2/3}) upper bound for the number of those numbers that are less than x and not the sum of two primes.
- With Imre Z. Ruzsa, he improved a result of Linnik by showing that every sufficiently large even number is the sum of two primes and at most 8 powers of 2.
- Goldston, S. W. Graham, Pintz, and Yıldırım proved that the difference between numbers which are products of exactly 2 primes is infinitely often at most 6.

== See also ==
- Prime gap
- Landau's problems
- Fazekas Mihály Gimnázium
- Maier's theorem
