= Cem Yıldırım =

Turkish mathematician

Cem Yalçın Yıldırım
- Born: 8 July 1961 (age 65)
- Citizenship: Republic of Turkey
- Education: Middle East Technical University (BS); University of Toronto (PhD)
- Awards: Cole Prize (2014)
- Scientific career
- Fields: Mathematics
- Workplaces: Bilkent University; Boğaziçi University
- Doctoral advisor: John Friedlander
- Website: math.boun.edu.tr/../yildirim.htm

Cem Yalçın Yıldırım (born 8 July 1961) is a Turkish mathematician who specializes in number theory.

== Education ==
Yıldırım obtained his BSc from Middle East Technical University in Ankara, Turkey and his PhD from the University of Toronto in 1990. His advisor was John Friedlander. He is a faculty member at Boğaziçi University in Istanbul, Turkey.

== Research ==
In 2009, Dan Goldston, János Pintz, and Yıldırım proved that for any positive number ε there exist primes p and p′ such that the difference between p and p′ is smaller than ε log p. This result was originally reported in 2003 by Goldston and Yıldırım but was later retracted. Then Janos Pintz joined the team and they completed the proof in 2005 and developed the so called GPY sieve.

== See also ==
- Landau's problems
