= Skewes's number =

Large number used in number theory

Unsolved problem in mathematics
What is the smallest Skewes's number?
More unsolved problems in mathematics

In number theory, Skewes's number is the smallest natural number $x$ for which the prime-counting function $\pi(x)$ exceeds the logarithmic integral function $\operatorname{li}(x).$ It is named for the South African mathematician Stanley Skewes who first computed an upper bound on its value.

The exact value of Skewes's number is still not known, but it is known that there is a crossing between $\pi(x) < \operatorname{li}(x)$ and $\pi(x) > \operatorname{li}(x)$ near $e^{727.95133} \approx 1.3972 \times 10^{316}.$ It is not known whether this is the smallest crossing.

The name is sometimes also applied to either of the large number bounds which Skewes found.

== Skewes's bounds ==
Although nobody has ever found a value of $x$ for which $\pi(x) > \operatorname{li}(x),$ Skewes's research supervisor J.E. Littlewood had proved in Littlewood (1914) that there is such a number (and so, a first such number); and indeed found that the sign of the difference $\pi(x) - \operatorname{li}(x)$ changes infinitely many times. Littlewood's proof did not, however, exhibit a concrete such number $x$, nor did it even give any bounds on the value.

Skewes's task was to make Littlewood's existence proof effective: exhibit some concrete upper bound for the first sign change. According to Georg Kreisel, this was not considered obvious even in principle at the time.

Skewes (1933) proved that, assuming that the Riemann hypothesis is true, there exists a number $x$ violating $\pi(x) < \operatorname{li}(x),$ below

$$e^{e^{e^{79}}}<10^{10^{10^{34}}}.$$

Without assuming the Riemann hypothesis, Skewes (1955) later proved that there exists a value of $x$ below

$$e^{e^{e^{e^{7.705}}}}<10^{10^{10^{964}}}.$$

== More recent bounds ==
These upper bounds have since been reduced considerably by using large-scale computer calculations of zeros of the Riemann zeta function. The first estimate for the actual value of a crossover point was given by Lehman (1966), who showed that somewhere between $1.53\times 10^{1165}$ and $1.65\times 10^{1165}$ there are more than $10^{500}$ consecutive integers $x$ with $\pi(x) > \operatorname{li}(x)$. Without assuming the Riemann hypothesis, H. J. J. te Riele (1987) proved an upper bound of $7\times 10^{370}$. A better estimate was $1.39822\times 10^{316}$ discovered by Bays & Hudson (2000), who showed there are at least $10^{153}$ consecutive integers somewhere near this value where $\pi(x) > \operatorname{li}(x)$. Bays and Hudson found a few much smaller values of $x$ where $\pi(x)$ gets close to $\operatorname{li}(x)$; the possibility that there are crossover points near these values does not seem to have been definitely ruled out yet, though computer calculations suggest they are unlikely to exist. Chao & Plymen (2010) gave a small improvement and correction to the result of Bays and Hudson. Saouter & Demichel (2010) found a smaller interval for a crossing, which was slightly improved by Zegowitz (2010). The same source shows that there exists a number $x$ violating $\pi(x) < \operatorname{li}(x),$ below $e^{727.9513468} \approx 1.397182 \times 10^{316}$. This can be reduced to $e^{727.9513386} \approx 1.397171 \times 10^{316}$ assuming the Riemann hypothesis. Stoll & Demichel (2011) conducted an analysis with up to 2×10^{11} complex zeros which gives computational evidence that a crossover may exist near $1.397162914 \times 10^{316}$.

Interval of crossing
Year	# of complex zeros used	by	Interval	# of consecutive integers with $\pi(x) > \operatorname{li}(x)$ given
2000	10^{6}	Bays and Hudson	[1.39821924×10^{316}, 1.39821925×10^{316}]	> 1×10^{153}
2010	10^{7}	Chao and Plymen	[exp(727.951858), exp(727.952178)]	1×10^{154}
2010	2.2×10^{7}	Saouter and Demichel	[exp(727.95132478), exp(727.95134682)] (without RH) [exp(727.95133239), exp(727.95133920)] (assuming RH)	6.6587×10^{152} (without RH); 1.2741×10^{151} (assuming RH)
2010	2.2×10^{7}	Zegowitz	[exp(727.951324783), exp(727.951346802)] (without RH) [exp(727.951332973), exp(727.951338612)] (assuming RH)	6.695531258×10^{152} (without RH); 1.15527413×10^{152} (assuming RH)

Working in the other direction, Rosser & Schoenfeld (1962) proved that there are no crossover points below $x = 10^8$, improved by Brent (1975) to $8\times 10^{10}$, by Kotnik (2008) to $10^{14}$, by Platt & Trudgian (2014) to $1.39\times 10^{17}$, and by Büthe (2015) to $10^{19}$.

There is no explicit value $x$ known for certain to have the property $\pi(x) > \operatorname{li}(x),$ though computer calculations suggest some explicit numbers that are quite likely to satisfy this.

Even though the natural density of the positive integers for which $\pi(x) > \operatorname{li}(x)$ does not exist, Wintner (1941) showed that the logarithmic density of these positive integers does exist and is positive. Rubinstein & Sarnak (1994) showed that this proportion is about 2.6×10^{−7}, which is surprisingly large given how far one has to go to find the first example.

== Riemann's formula ==
Riemann gave an explicit formula for $\pi(x)$, whose leading terms are (ignoring some subtle convergence questions)

$$\pi(x) = \operatorname{li}(x) - \tfrac{1}{2}\operatorname{li}(\sqrt{x\,}) - \sum_{\rho} \operatorname{li}(x^\rho) + \text{smaller terms}$$

where the sum is over all $\rho$ in the set of non-trivial zeros of the Riemann zeta function.

The largest error term in the approximation $\pi(x) \approx \operatorname{li}(x)$ (if the Riemann hypothesis is true) is negative $\tfrac{1}{2}\operatorname{li}(\sqrt{x\,})$, showing that $\operatorname{li}(x)$ is usually larger than $\pi(x)$. The other terms above are somewhat smaller, and moreover tend to have different, seemingly random complex arguments, so mostly cancel out. Occasionally however, several of the larger ones might happen to have roughly the same complex argument, in which case they will reinforce each other instead of cancelling and will overwhelm the term $\tfrac{1}{2}\operatorname{li}(\sqrt{x\,})$.

The reason why the Skewes number is so large is that these smaller terms are quite a lot smaller than the leading error term, mainly because the first complex zero of the zeta function has quite a large imaginary part, so a large number (several hundred) of them need to have roughly the same argument in order to overwhelm the dominant term. The chance of $N$ random complex numbers having roughly the same argument is about 1 in $2^N$. This explains why $\pi(x)$ is sometimes larger than $\operatorname{li}(x),$ and also why it is rare for this to happen. It also shows why finding places where this happens depends on large scale calculations of millions of high precision zeros of the Riemann zeta function.

The argument above is not a proof, as it assumes the zeros of the Riemann zeta function are random, which is not true. Roughly speaking, Littlewood's proof consists of Dirichlet's approximation theorem to show that sometimes many terms have about the same argument. In the event that the Riemann hypothesis is false, the argument is much simpler, essentially because the terms $\operatorname{li}(x^{\rho})$ for zeros violating the Riemann hypothesis (with real part greater than 1/2) are eventually larger than $\operatorname{li}(x^{1/2})$.

The reason for the term $\tfrac{1}{2}\mathrm{li}(x^{1/2})$ is that, roughly speaking, $\mathrm{li}(x)$ actually counts powers of primes, rather than the primes themselves, with $p^n$ weighted by $\frac{1}{n}$. The term $\tfrac{1}{2}\mathrm{li}(x^{1/2})$ is roughly analogous to a second-order correction accounting for squares of primes.

== Equivalent for prime k-tuples ==
An equivalent definition of Skewes's number exists for prime k-tuples (Tóth (2019)). Let $P = (p, p+i_1, p+i_2, ..., p+i_k)$ denote a prime (k + 1)-tuple, $\pi_P(x)$ the number of primes $p$ below $x$ such that $p, p+i_1, p+i_2, ..., p+i_k$ are all prime, let $\operatorname{li_P}(x) = \int_2^x \frac{dt}{(\ln t)^{k+1}}$ and let $C_P$ denote its Hardy–Littlewood constant (see First Hardy–Littlewood conjecture). Then the first prime $p$ that violates the Hardy–Littlewood inequality for the (k + 1)-tuple $P$, i.e., the first prime $p$ such that

$$\pi_P(p) > C_P \operatorname{li}_P(p),$$

(if such a prime exists) is the Skewes number for $P.$

The table below shows the currently known Skewes numbers for prime k-tuples:

Prime k-tuple	Skewes number	Found by
(p, p + 2)	1369391	Wolf (2011)
(p, p + 4)	5206837	Tóth (2019)
(p, p + 2, p + 6)	87613571	Tóth (2019)
(p, p + 4, p + 6)	337867	Tóth (2019)
(p, p + 2, p + 6, p + 8)	1172531	Tóth (2019)
(p, p + 4, p +6 , p + 10)	827929093	Tóth (2019)
(p, p + 2, p + 6, p + 8, p + 12)	21432401	Tóth (2019)
(p, p +4 , p +6 , p + 10, p + 12)	216646267	Tóth (2019)
(p, p + 4, p + 6, p + 10, p + 12, p + 16)	251331775687	Tóth (2019)
(p, p+2, p+6, p+8, p+12, p+18, p+20)	7572964186421	Pfoertner (2020)
(p, p+2, p+8, p+12, p+14, p+18, p+20)	214159878489239	Pfoertner (2020)
(p, p+2, p+6, p+8, p+12, p+18, p+20, p+26)	1203255673037261	Pfoertner / Luhn (2021)
(p, p+2, p+6, p+12, p+14, p+20, p+24, p+26)	523250002674163757	Luhn / Pfoertner (2021)
(p, p+6, p+8, p+14, p+18, p+20, p+24, p+26)	750247439134737983	Pfoertner / Luhn (2021)

The Skewes number (if it exists) for sexy primes $(p, p+6)$ is still unknown.

It is also unknown whether all admissible k-tuples have a corresponding Skewes number.

== See also ==
- Mertens' theorems § Changes in sign
