= Sexy primes =

Prime numbers which differ by 6

In number theory, sexy primes are prime numbers that differ from another prime by 6. For example, the numbers 5 and 11 are a pair of sexy primes, because both are prime and $11 - 5 = 6$.

The term "sexy prime" is a pun stemming from the Latin word for six: sex.

If p + 2 or p + 4 (where p is the lower prime) is also prime, then the sexy prime is part of a prime triplet.

== Sexy prime conjecture ==
Unsolved problem in mathematics
Are there infinitely many sexy primes?
More unsolved problems in mathematics

The sexy prime conjecture is a weaker analogue of the twin prime conjecture. It asserts that there exist infinitely many pairs of prime numbers that differ by 6, known as sexy primes.

Let p_{n} denote the nth prime number, and define
$$H_m = \liminf_{n \to \infty} (p_{n+m} - p_n)$$

The quantity H_{m} is the smallest gap that occurs infinitely often between primes separated by m positions in the sequence of prime numbers. In particular, the sexy prime conjecture is equivalent to the statement
$$H_1 \leq 6,$$
which asserts that prime gaps of size at most 6 occur infinitely often. Since every prime gap greater than 2 is even, this is equivalent to the existence of infinitely many sexy prime pairs.

In August 2014, the Polymath group, seeking the proof of the twin prime conjecture, showed that if the generalized Elliott–Halberstam conjecture is proven, one can show the existence of infinitely many pairs of consecutive primes that differ by at most 6 and as such they are either twin, cousin or sexy primes.

== Examples ==
The sexy primes (sequences OEIS: A023201 and OEIS: A046117 in OEIS) below 500 are:

(5,11), (7,13), (11,17), (13,19), (17,23), (23,29), (31,37), (37,43), (41,47), (47,53), (53,59), (61,67), (67,73), (73,79), (83,89), (97,103), (101,107), (103,109), (107,113), (131,137), (151,157), (157,163), (167,173), (173,179), (191,197), (193,199), (223,229), (227,233), (233,239), (251,257), (257,263), (263,269), (271,277), (277,283), (307,313), (311,317), (331,337), (347,353), (353,359), (367,373), (373,379), (383,389), (433,439), (443,449), (457,463), (461,467).

The only sexy primes quintuplet is (5,11,17,23,29).
