= Yitang Zhang =

Chinese-born American mathematician

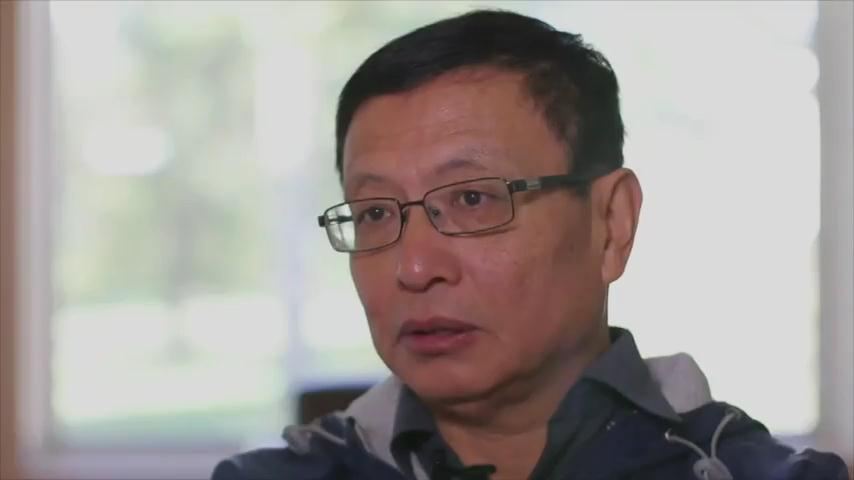
- Zhang in 2014
- Born: February 5, 1955 (age 71); Shanghai, China
- Citizenship: United States
- Education: Peking University (BS, MS); Purdue University (PhD)
- Known for: Establishing the existence of an infinitely repeatable prime 2-tuple
- Awards: Ostrowski Prize (2013); Cole Prize (2014); Rolf Schock Prize (2014); MacArthur Fellowship (2014)
- Scientific career
- Fields: Number theory
- Workplaces: University of New Hampshire; University of California, Santa Barbara; Sun Yat-sen University
- Thesis: The Jacobian conjecture and the degree of field extension (1992)
- Doctoral advisor: Tzuong-Tsieng Moh (莫宗堅)

Yitang Zhang (Chinese: 张益唐; pinyin: Zhāng Yìtáng; born February 5, 1955) is a Chinese-American mathematician primarily working in the field of number theory. He is a professor of mathematics at Sun Yat-sen University.

In 2013, while working as a lecturer at the University of New Hampshire, Zhang submitted an important paper on the Twin Prime Conjecture to the Annals of Mathematics, establishing the first finite bound on the least gap between consecutive primes that is attained infinitely often. Later that year, he was awarded the Ostrowski Prize, and then in 2014, the Cole Prize, Rolf Schock Prize, and a MacArthur Fellowship.

Zhang became a professor of mathematics at the University of California, Santa Barbara in fall 2015. He retired from UCSB in 2025 and returned to China as a professor at Sun Yat-sen University.

== Early life and education ==
Zhang was born in Shanghai, China. His ancestral home is in Pinghu, Zhejiang. He lived in Shanghai with his grandmother until he attended college. At around 9 years old, he found a proof of the Pythagorean theorem. He first learned about Fermat's Last Theorem and Goldbach's conjecture when he was 10 years old.

During the Cultural Revolution, Zhang and his mother were sent to the countryside to work in the fields. He worked as a laborer for 10 years, during which he was unable to attend high school. After the end of the Cultural Revolution, Zhang enrolled at Peking University in 1978, graduating with a Bachelor of Science in mathematics in 1982. He then pursued graduate studies at the university under number theorist Pan Chengbiao and earned a Master of Science in mathematics in 1984.

With recommendations from Ding Shisun, the president of Peking University, and Deng Donggao, the chair of the math department at Peking University, Zhang won a full scholarship to pursue doctoral studies at Purdue University, beginning in January 1985. He earned his Ph.D. in mathematics in December 1991.

== Career ==
Zhang's PhD work was on the two-dimensional Jacobian conjecture. After graduation, Zhang had trouble finding an academic position. In a 2013 interview with Nautilus magazine, Zhang said he did not get a job after graduation. "During that period it was difficult to find a job in academics. That was a job market problem. Also, my advisor [Tzuong-Tsieng Moh] did not write me letters of recommendation." Zhang made this claim again in George Csicsery's documentary film "Counting from Infinity: Yitang Zhang and the Twin Prime Conjecture" while discussing his difficulties at Purdue and in the years that followed. Moh claimed that Zhang never came back to him requesting recommendation letters. In a detailed profile published in The New Yorker magazine in February 2015, Alec Wilkinson wrote Zhang "parted unhappily" with Moh, and that Zhang "left Purdue without Moh's support, and, having published no papers, was unable to find an academic job". In 2018, responding to reports of his treatment of Zhang, Moh posted an update on his website. Moh wrote that Zhang "failed miserably" in proving the two-dimensional Jacobian conjecture, "never published any paper on algebraic geometry" after leaving Purdue, and "wasted seven years of his own life and my time".

After some years, Zhang managed to find a position as a lecturer at the University of New Hampshire, where he was hired by Kenneth Appel in 1999. Prior to getting back to academia, he worked for several years as an accountant and a delivery worker for a New York City restaurant. He also worked in a motel in Kentucky and in a Subway sandwich shop. A profile published in Quanta Magazine reports that Zhang used to live in his car during the initial job-hunting days. He served as lecturer at UNH from 1999 until around January 2014, when UNH appointed him to a full professorship as a result of his breakthrough on prime numbers. Zhang stayed for a semester at the Institute for Advanced Study in Princeton, NJ, in 2014, and he joined the University of California, Santa Barbara in fall 2015. He took a full-time position at Sun Yat-sen University in Guangzhou, China on June 27, 2025. As of September 2025, Zhang works at the university's main campus in Guangzhou, but plans to primarily work at the university's Hong Kong Institute of Advanced Study in Hong Kong after its construction is completed.

== Research ==
On April 17, 2013, Zhang announced a proof that there are infinitely many pairs of prime numbers that differ by less than 70 million. This result implies the existence of an infinitely repeatable prime 2-tuple, thus establishing a theorem akin to the twin prime conjecture. Zhang's paper was accepted by Annals of Mathematics in early May 2013, his first publication since his last paper in 2001. The proof was refereed by leading experts in analytic number theory. Research programs such as the Polymath Project built upon Zhang's result, eventually lowering the bounded gap to 212 as of September 2026.

If P(N) stands for the proposition that there is an infinitude of pairs of prime numbers (not necessarily consecutive primes) that differ by exactly N, then Zhang's result is equivalent to the statement that there exists at least one even integer k < 70,000,000 such that P(k) is true. The classical form of the twin prime conjecture is P(2); and in fact it has been conjectured that P(k) holds for all even integers k. While these stronger conjectures remain unproven, a result due to James Maynard in November 2013, employing a different technique, showed that P(k) holds for some k ≤ 600. Subsequently, in April 2014, the Polymath project 8 lowered the bound to k ≤ 246. If the Elliott–Halberstam conjecture and its generalization, respectively, hold, then k ≤ 12 and k ≤ 6 follow using current methods.

== Honors and awards ==
Zhang was awarded the 2013 Morningside Special Achievement Award in Mathematics, the 2013 Ostrowski Prize, the 2014 Frank Nelson Cole Prize in Number Theory, and the 2014 Rolf Schock Prize in Mathematics.

He is a recipient of the 2014 MacArthur award, and was elected as an Academia Sinica Fellow during the same year. He was an invited speaker at the 2014 International Congress of Mathematicians.

In 2021, Zhang was awarded an honorary Doctor of Science degree from the University of Hong Kong.

== Political views ==
In 1989 Zhang joined a group interested in Chinese democracy (中国民联). In a 2013 interview, he affirmed that his political views on the subject had not changed since. In 2025, Zhang cited the "political climate" of the United States as a reason for his return to China.

== Publications ==
- Zhang, Yitang (2007). "On the Landau-Siegel Zeros Conjecture". arXiv:0705.4306 [math.NT].
- Zhang, Yitang (2014). "Bounded gaps between primes". Annals of Mathematics. 179 (3): 1121–1174. doi:10.4007/annals.2014.179.3.7.
- Zhang, Yitang (2022). "Discrete mean estimates and the Landau-Siegel zero". arXiv:2211.02515 [math.NT].
