= Battle of the Coral Sea =

Major naval battle in the Pacific Theater of World War II

- Part of Operation Mo of South West Pacific theater of World War II
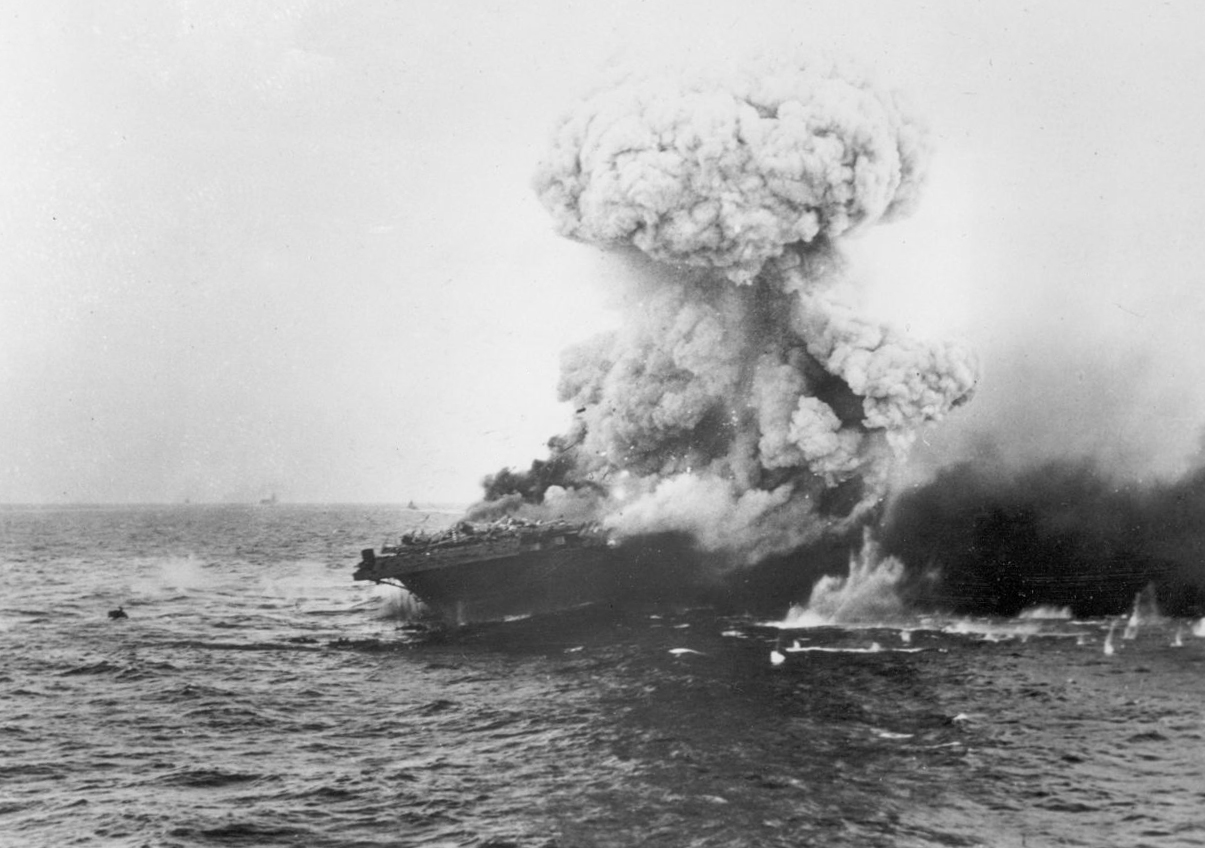
- The American aircraft carrier USS Lexington explodes on 8 May 1942, several hours after being damaged by a Japanese carrier air attack.
Date	4–8 May 1942
Location	Northern Coral Sea
Result	See Significance

Belligerents
United States; Australia	Japan

Commanders and leaders
Frank Jack Fletcher; Aubrey Fitch; Douglas MacArthur; John Gregory Crace	Shigeyoshi Inoue; Takeo Takagi; Chūichi Hara; Aritomo Gotō

Strength
2 fleet carriers; 8 cruisers; 14 destroyers; 2 oilers; 128 carrier aircraft. (Note: U.S. carrier aircraft numbers by ship the morning of 7 May: Lexington- 35 Douglas SBD Dauntless dive bombers, 12 Douglas TBD Devastator torpedo bombers, 19 Grumman F4F-3 Wildcat fighters; Yorktown- 35 SBD, 10 TBD, 17 F4F-3.)	2 fleet carriers; 1 light carrier; 9 cruisers; 15 destroyers; 5 minesweepers; 2 minelayers; 2 submarine chasers; 3 gunboats; 1 oiler; 1 seaplane tender; 12 transports; 139 carrier aircraft. (Note: The smaller warships included 5 minesweepers, 2 minelayers, 2 subchasers, and 3 gunboats. Japanese carrier aircraft numbers by ship: Shōkaku 58 total – 21 Aichi D3A Type 99 "kanbaku" dive bombers, 19 Nakajima B5N Type 97 "kankō" torpedo bombers, 18 A6M2 Zero fighters; Zuikaku 63 total – 21 kankō, 22 kanbaku, 20 Zeros; Shōhō 18 total – 6 kankō, 4 Mitsubishi A5M Type 96 fighters, 8 Zeros. Cressman 2000, p. 93 states Shōhō carried 13 fighters without specifying how many of which type. Lundstrom's numbers are used in this article.)

Casualties and losses
1 fleet carrier sunk; 1 destroyer sunk; 1 oiler sunk; 1 fleet carrier damaged; 69 aircraft destroyed (Note: Yorktown lost 16 aircraft, Lexington lost 51 aircraft, including 33 SBDs, 13 TBDs, and 21 F4Fs. One Royal Australian Air Force (RAAF) PBY Catalina maritime patrol aircraft was lost on 4 May and another on 6 May (Gillison). One B-17 from the 40th Reconnaissance Squadron returning from a bombing mission ran out of fuel on 7 May and crashed and was destroyed. That loss is not recorded in the total aircraft lost..) 715 killed (Note: Carrier aircrew deaths were: Yorktown-14, Lexington-21. Warship crew deaths were: Lexington-216, Yorktown-40, Sims-239, Neosho-183, and Chicago-2. The crews of the two RAAF PBYs totalled about 10 men.)	1 light carrier sunk; 1 destroyer sunk; 3 minesweepers sunk; 1 fleet carrier damaged; 1 destroyer damaged; 1 smaller warship damaged; 1 transport damaged; 69–97 aircraft destroyed (Note: Breakdown of carrier aircraft losses: 19 Zeros, 19 kanbaku (dive bomber), and 31 kankō (torpedo bomber). Millot adds that 2 Kawanishi H6K maritime patrol, 5 Mitsubishi G4M (Type 1) bombers, 3 smaller seaplanes, and 87 carrier aircraft were destroyed.) 966 killed (Note: Breakdown of deaths: Carrier aircrew-90, Shōhō-631, Shōkaku-108, Tulagi invasion force-87, and approximately 50 killed in the destroyed H6K, Type 1, and smaller seaplanes.)

The Battle of the Coral Sea, from 4 to 8 May 1942, was a major naval battle between the Imperial Japanese Navy (IJN) and naval and air forces of the United States and Australia. Taking place in the Pacific Theatre of World War II, the battle was the first naval action in which the opposing fleets neither sighted nor fired upon one another, attacking over the horizon from aircraft carriers instead. It was also the first military battle between aircraft carriers.

To strengthen their defensive position in the South Pacific, the Japanese decided to invade and occupy Port Moresby (in the Territory of Papua) and Tulagi (in the southeastern Solomon Islands). The plan, Operation Mo, involved several major units of Japan's Combined Fleet. Two fleet carriers and a light carrier were assigned to provide air cover for the invasion forces, under the overall command of Admiral Shigeyoshi Inoue. The US learned of the Japanese plan through signals intelligence and sent two US Navy carrier task forces and a joint Australian-American cruiser force to oppose the offensive, under the overall command of US Admiral Frank J. Fletcher.

On 3–4 May, Japanese forces invaded and occupied Tulagi, although several supporting warships were sunk or damaged in a surprise attack by the US carrier Yorktown. Alerted to the presence of enemy aircraft carriers, the Japanese fleet carriers advanced towards the Coral Sea to locate and destroy the Allied naval forces. On the evening of 6 May, the two carrier fleets closed to within 70 nmi (81 mi; 130 km) but did not detect each other in the darkness. The next day, both fleets launched airstrikes against what they thought were the enemy fleet carriers, but both sides actually attacked other targets. The US sank the Japanese light carrier Shōhō, and the Japanese sank the destroyer Sims, and damaged the fleet oiler Neosho. On 8 May, both sides finally located and attacked the other's fleet carriers, leaving the Japanese fleet carrier Shōkaku damaged, the US fleet carrier Yorktown damaged, and the Lexington so critically damaged she was later scuttled.

Both sides having suffered heavy aircraft losses and carriers sunk or damaged, the two forces disengaged and retired from the area. Because of the loss of carrier air cover, Inoue also recalled the Port Moresby invasion fleet. Although the battle was a tactical victory for the Japanese in terms of ships sunk, it has been described as a strategic victory for the Allies. The battle marked the first time since the start of the war that a major Japanese advance had been turned back. More important, the damage to Shōkaku and the aircraft losses of Zuikaku prevented both ships from participating in the Battle of Midway the following month.

== Background ==
=== Japanese expansion ===
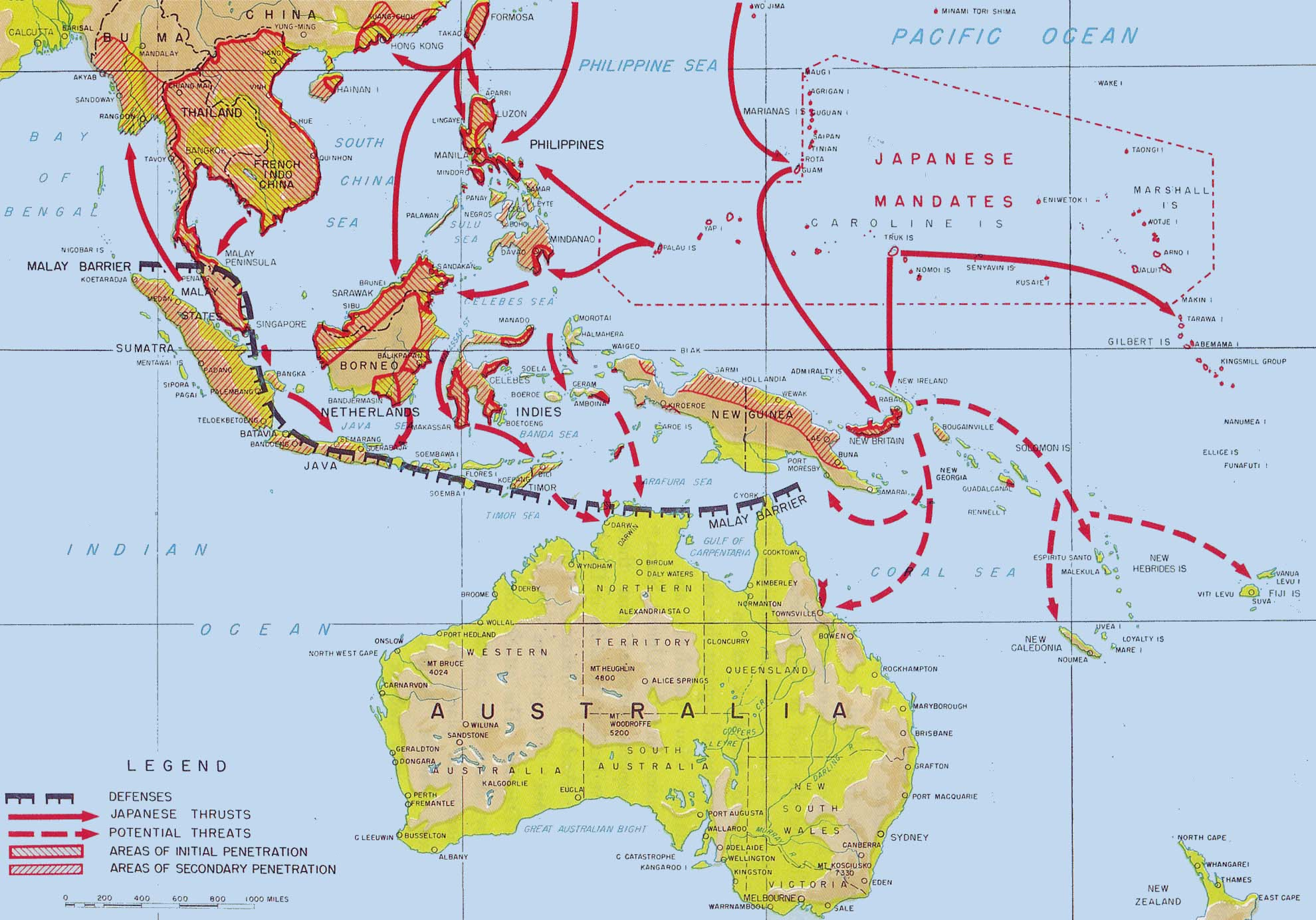
Japanese advances in the Southwest Pacific from December 1941 to April 1942

On 8 December 1941 (7 December US time), Japan declared war on the US and the British Empire, after Japanese forces attacked Malaya, Singapore and Hong Kong as well as the US naval base at Pearl Harbor. In launching this war, Japanese leaders sought to neutralize the US fleet, seize territory rich in natural resources, and obtain strategic military bases to defend their far-flung empire. In the words of the Imperial Japanese Navy (IJN) Combined Fleet's "Secret Order Number One", dated 1 November 1941, the goals of the initial Japanese campaigns in the impending war were to "[eject] British and American strength from the Netherlands Indies and the Philippines, [and] to establish a policy of autonomous self-sufficiency and economic independence."

To support these goals, during the first few months of 1942, besides Malaya, Japanese forces attacked and took control of the Philippines, Singapore, the Dutch East Indies, Wake Island, New Britain, the Gilbert Islands and Guam, inflicting heavy losses on opposing Allied land, naval and air forces. Japan planned to use these conquered territories to establish a perimeter defense for its empire from which it expected to employ attritional tactics to defeat or exhaust any Allied counterattacks.

Shortly after the war began, the Japanese Naval General Staff, under the leadership of Admiral Osami Nagano, recommended an invasion of Northern Australia to prevent Australia from being used as a base to threaten Japan's perimeter defenses in the South Pacific. The Imperial Japanese Army (IJA) rejected the recommendation, stating that it did not have the forces or shipping capacity available to conduct such an operation. At the same time, Vice Admiral Shigeyoshi Inoue, commander of the IJN's Fourth Fleet (also called the South Seas Force) which consisted of most of the naval units in the South Pacific area, advocated the occupation of Tulagi in the southeastern Solomon Islands and Port Moresby in New Guinea, which would put Northern Australia within range of Japanese land-based aircraft. Inoue believed the capture and control of these locations would provide greater security and defensive depth for the major Japanese base at Rabaul on New Britain. The navy's general staff and the IJA accepted Inoue's proposal and promoted further operations, using these locations as supporting bases, to seize New Caledonia, Fiji, and Samoa and thereby cut the supply and communication lines between Australia and the United States. (Note: The Senshi Sōshō does not mention Inoue's role in the decision to invade Port Moresby, only stating it was a product of an agreement between the IJN and IJA in January 1942.)

In April 1942, the army and navy developed a plan that was titled Operation Mo. The plan called for Port Moresby to be invaded from the sea and secured by 10 May. The plan also included the seizure of Tulagi on 2–3 May, where the navy would establish a seaplane base for potential air operations against Allied territories and forces in the South Pacific and to provide a base for reconnaissance aircraft. Upon the completion of MO, the navy planned to initiate Operation RY, using ships released from MO, to seize Nauru and Ocean Island for their phosphate deposits on 15 May. Further operations against Fiji, Samoa and New Caledonia (Operation FS) were to be planned once MO and RY were completed. Because of a damaging air attack by Allied land- and carrier-based aircraft on Japanese naval forces invading the Lae-Salamaua area in New Guinea in March, Inoue requested Japan's Combined Fleet send carriers to provide air cover for MO. Inoue was especially worried about Allied bombers stationed at air bases in Townsville and Cooktown, Australia, beyond the range of his own bombers, based at Rabaul and Lae.

Admiral Isoroku Yamamoto, commander of the Combined Fleet, was concurrently planning an operation for June that he hoped would lure the US Navy's carriers, none of which had been damaged in the Pearl Harbor attack, into a decisive showdown in the central Pacific near Midway Atoll. In the meantime Yamamoto detached some of his large warships, including two fleet carriers, a light carrier, a cruiser division, and two destroyer divisions, to support MO, and placed Inoue in charge of the naval portion of the operation.

=== Allied response ===
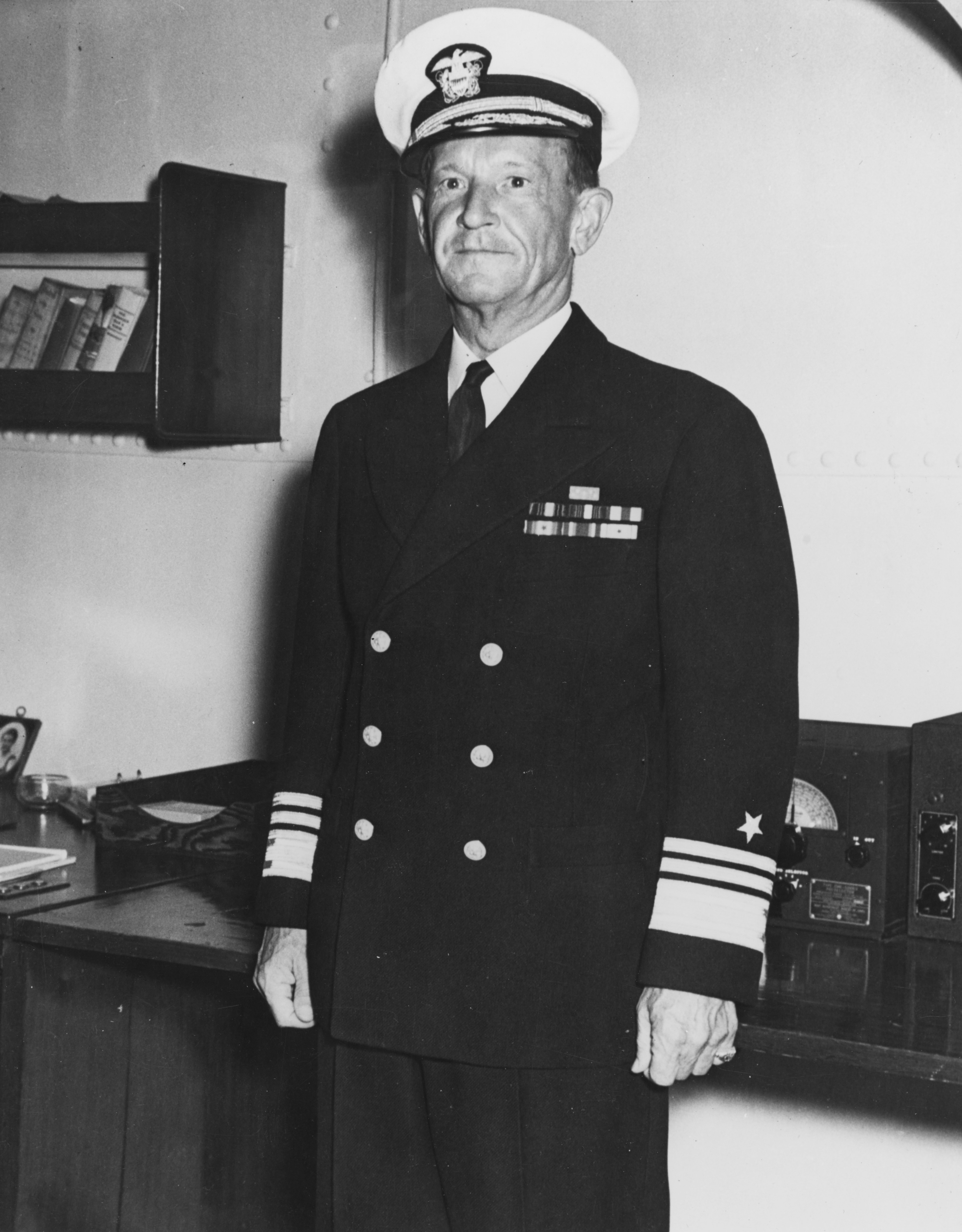
Frank Jack Fletcher, commander of US Task Force 17

Unknown to the Japanese, the US Navy, led by the Communication Security Section of the Office of Naval Communications, had for several years enjoyed increasing success with penetrating Japanese communication ciphers and codes. By March 1942, the US was able to decipher up to 15% of the IJN's Ro or Naval Codebook D code (called "JN-25B" by the US), which was used by the IJN for about half of its communications. By the end of April, the US was reading up to 85% of the signals broadcast in the Ro code.

In March 1942, the US first noticed mention of the MO operation in intercepted messages. On 5 April, the US intercepted an IJN message directing a carrier and other large warships to proceed to Inoue's area of operations. On 13 April, the British deciphered an IJN message informing Inoue that the Fifth Carrier Division, consisting of the fleet carriers Shōkaku and Zuikaku, was en route to his command from Formosa via the main IJN base at Truk. The British passed the message to the US, along with their conclusion that Port Moresby was the likely target of MO.

Admiral Chester W. Nimitz, the new commander of US forces in the Central Pacific, and his staff discussed the deciphered messages and agreed that the Japanese were likely initiating a major operation in the Southwest Pacific in early May with Port Moresby as the probable target. The Allies regarded Port Moresby as a key base for a planned counteroffensive, under General Douglas MacArthur, against Japanese forces in the South West Pacific area. Nimitz's staff also concluded that the Japanese operation might include carrier raids on Allied bases in Samoa and at Suva. Nimitz, after consultation with Admiral Ernest King, Commander in Chief of the United States Fleet, decided to contest the Japanese operation by sending all four of the Pacific Fleet's available aircraft carriers to the Coral Sea. By 27 April, further signals intelligence confirmed most of the details and targets of the MO and RY plans.

On 29 April, Nimitz issued orders that sent his four carriers and their supporting warships towards the Coral Sea. Task Force 17 (TF 17), commanded by Rear Admiral Fletcher and consisting of the carrier Yorktown, escorted by three cruisers and four destroyers and supported by a replenishment group of two oilers and two destroyers, was already in the South Pacific, having departed Tongatabu on 27 April en route to the Coral Sea. TF 11, commanded by Rear Admiral Aubrey Fitch and consisting of the carrier Lexington with two cruisers and five destroyers, was between Fiji and New Caledonia. TF 16, commanded by Vice Admiral William F. Halsey and including the carriers Enterprise and Hornet, had just returned to Pearl Harbor from the Doolittle Raid in the central Pacific. TF 16 immediately departed but would not reach the South Pacific in time to participate in the battle. Nimitz placed Fletcher in command of Allied naval forces in the South Pacific area until Halsey arrived with TF 16. (Note: Lexington returned to Pearl Harbor on 26 March 1942 after operating in the Coral Sea with Yorktown and departed on 15 April to deliver 14 United States Marine Corps Brewster F2A fighters and pilots to Palmyra Atoll. After the delivery, on 18 April, TF 11 was ordered to head for Fiji and then towards New Caledonia to rendezvous with TF 17). Halsey was to take command of all three task forces once TF 16 arrived in the Coral Sea area. TF 17 consisted of Yorktown, cruisers Astoria, Chester, and Portland, plus the destroyers Hammann, Anderson, Perkins, Morris, Russell, and Sims and oilers Neosho and Tippecanoe. Yorktown's captain was Elliott Buckmaster. TF11 included the cruisers Minneapolis and New Orleans plus destroyers Phelps, Dewey, Aylwin, and Monaghan. TF 16 departed Pearl Harbor on 30 April.}} Although the Coral Sea area was under MacArthur's command, Fletcher and Halsey were directed to continue to report to Nimitz while in the Coral Sea area, not to MacArthur.

Based on un-encrypted intercepted radio traffic from TF 16 as it returned to Pearl Harbor, the Japanese assumed that all but one of the US Navy's carriers were in the central Pacific. The Japanese did not know the location of the remaining carrier, but did not expect a US carrier response to MO until the operation was well under way.

== Battle ==
=== Prelude ===
During late April, the Japanese submarines Ro-33 and Ro-34 reconnoitered the area where landings were planned. The submarines investigated Rossel Island and the Deboyne Group anchorage in the Louisiade Archipelago, Jomard Channel, and the route to Port Moresby from the east. They did not sight any Allied ships in the area and returned to Rabaul on 23 and 24 April respectively.

The Japanese Port Moresby Invasion Force, commanded by Rear Admiral Kōsō Abe, included 11 transport ships carrying about 5,000 soldiers from the IJA's South Seas Detachment plus about 500 troops from the 3rd Kure Special Naval Landing Force (SNLF). Escorting the transports was the Port Moresby Attack Force with one light cruiser and six relatively old Kamikaze and Mutsuki-class destroyers under the command of Rear Admiral Sadamichi Kajioka. Abe's ships departed Rabaul for the 840 nmi (970 mi; 1,560 km) trip to Port Moresby on 4 May and were joined by Kajioka's force the next day. The ships, proceeding at 8 kn (9.2 mph; 15 km/h), planned to transit the Jomard Channel in the Louisiades to pass around the southern tip of New Guinea to arrive at Port Moresby by 10 May. The Allied garrison at Port Moresby numbered around 5,333 men, but only half of these were infantry and all were badly equipped and undertrained.

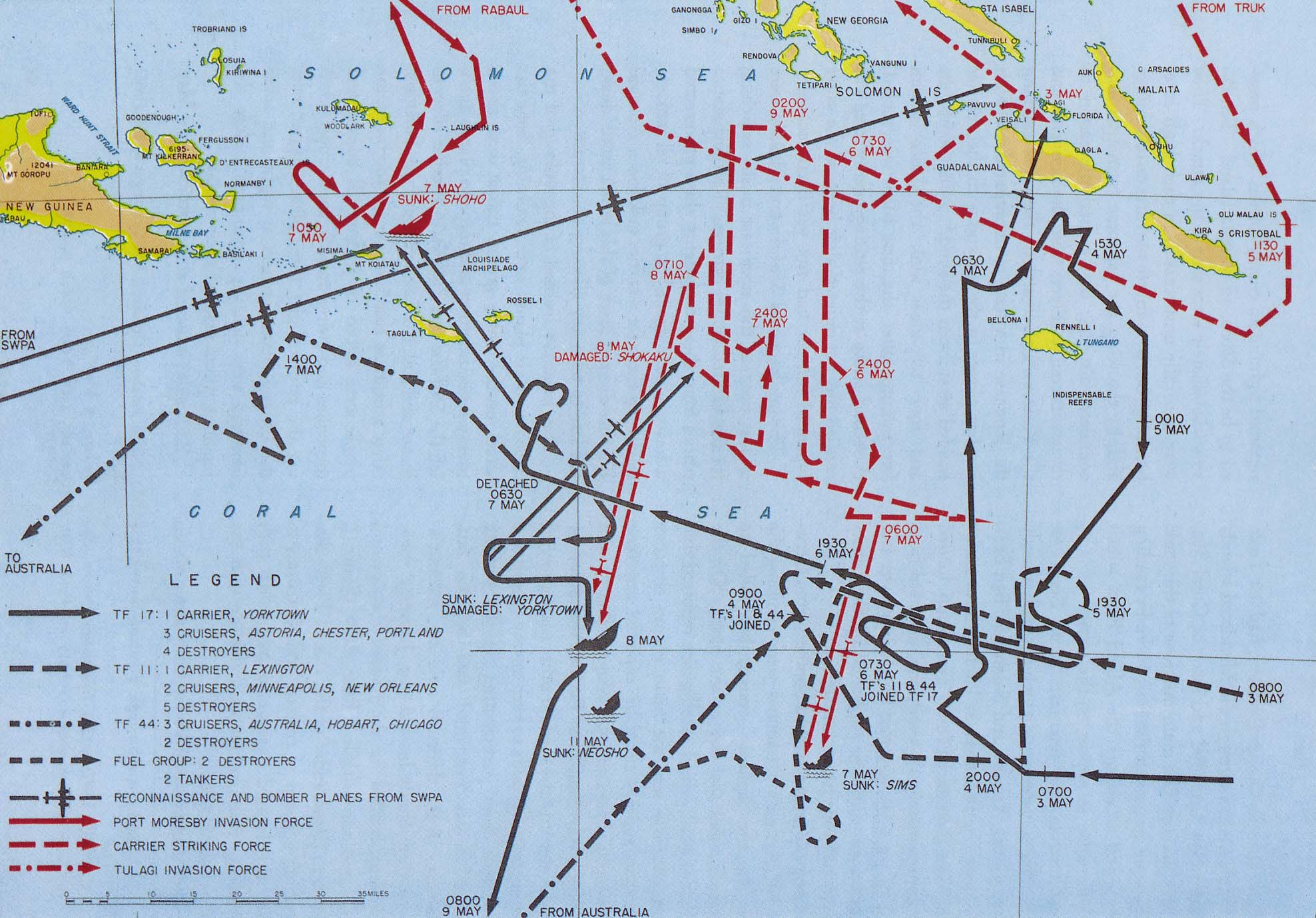
Map of the battle, 3–9 May, showing the movements of most of the major forces involved

The Tulagi invasion force, commanded by Rear Admiral Kiyohide Shima, consisted of two minelayers, two older Mutsuki-class destroyers, five minesweepers, two subchasers and a transport ship carrying about 400 troops from the 3rd Kure SNLF. Supporting the Tulagi force was the covering group with the light carrier Shōhō, the IJN's four Furutaka /Aoba-class heavy cruisers, and one destroyer, commanded by Rear Admiral Aritomo Gotō. A separate cover force (sometimes referred to as the support group), commanded by Rear Admiral Kuninori Marumo and consisting of two light cruisers, the seaplane tender Kamikawa Maru and three gunboats, joined the covering group in providing distant protection for the Tulagi invasion. Once Tulagi was secured on 3 or 4 May, the covering group and cover force were to reposition to help screen the Port Moresby invasion. Inoue directed the MO operation from the cruiser Kashima, with which he arrived at Rabaul from Truk on 4 May.

Gotō's force left Truk on 28 April, cut through the Solomons between Bougainville and Choiseul and took station near New Georgia Island. Marumo's support group sortied from New Ireland on 29 April headed for Thousand Ships Bay, Santa Isabel Island, to establish a seaplane base on 2 May to support the Tulagi assault. Shima's invasion force departed Rabaul on 30 April.

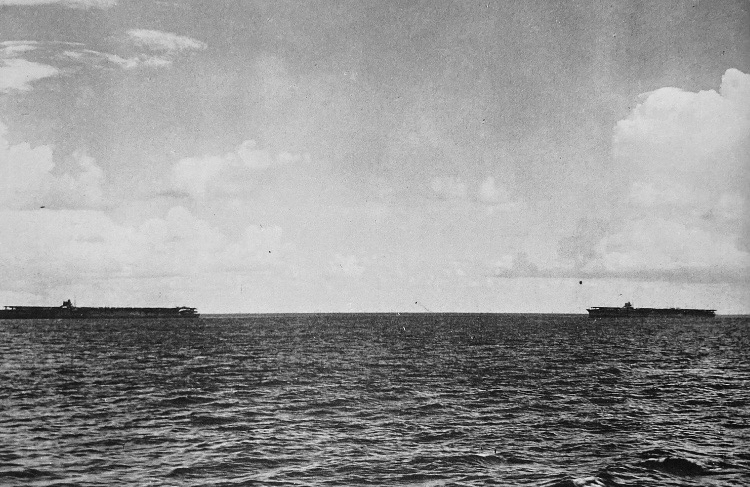
Shōkaku and Zuikaku off Hitokappu Bay, 19 November 1941

The Carrier Strike Force, consisting of the aircraft carriers Shōkaku and Zuikaku, the heavy cruisers Myōkō and Haguro, and the destroyers Shigure, Shiratsuyu, Ariake, Yūgure, Ushio, and Akebono sortied from Truk on 1 May. The strike force was commanded by Vice Admiral Takeo Takagi (flag on cruiser Myōkō), with Rear Admiral Chūichi Hara, on Zuikaku, in tactical command of the carrier air forces. The Carrier Strike Force was to proceed down the eastern side of the Solomon Islands and enter the Coral Sea south of Guadalcanal. Once in the Coral Sea, the carriers were to provide air cover for the invasion forces, eliminate Allied air power at Port Moresby, and intercept and destroy any Allied naval forces which entered the Coral Sea in response.

En route to the Coral Sea, Takagi's carriers were to deliver nine Zero fighter aircraft to Rabaul. Bad weather during two attempts to make the delivery on 2–3 May compelled the aircraft to return to the carriers, stationed 240 nmi (280 mi; 440 km) from Rabaul, and one of the Zeros was forced to ditch in the sea. In order to try to keep to the MO timetable, Takagi was forced to abandon the delivery mission after the second attempt and direct his force towards the Solomon Islands to refuel.

To give advance warning of the approach of any Allied naval forces, the Japanese sent submarines I-22, I-24, I-28 and I-29 to form a scouting line in the ocean about 450 nmi (520 mi; 830 km) southwest of Guadalcanal. Fletcher's forces had entered the Coral Sea area before the submarines took station, and the Japanese were therefore unaware of their presence. Another submarine, I-21, which was sent to scout around Nouméa, was attacked by Yorktown aircraft on 2 May. The submarine took no damage and apparently did not realize that it had been attacked by carrier aircraft. Ro-33 and Ro-34 were also deployed in an attempt to blockade Port Moresby, arriving off the town on 5 May. Neither submarine engaged any ships during the battle.

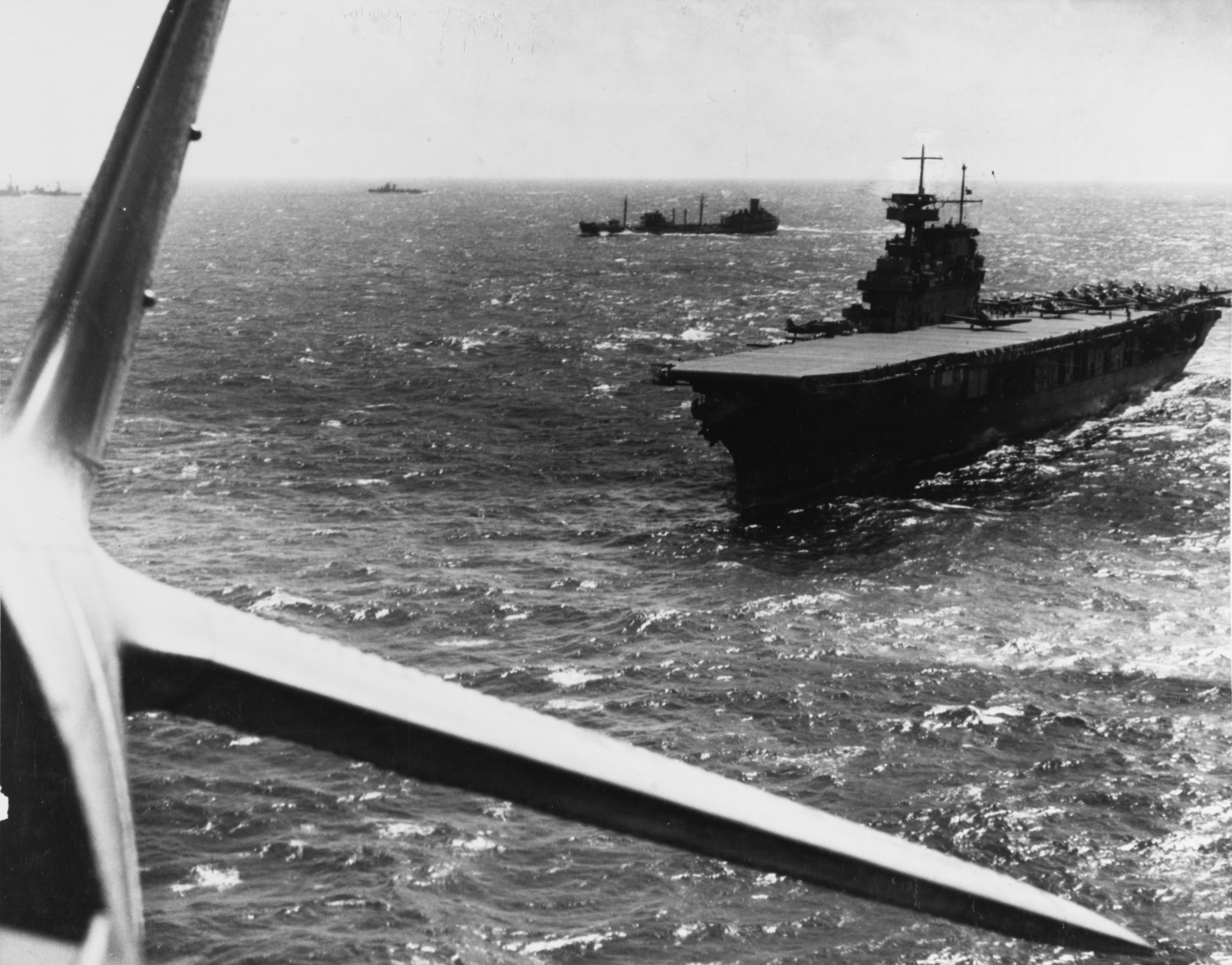
Yorktown conducts aircraft operations in the Pacific sometime before the battle. A fleet oiler is in the near background.

On the morning of 1 May, TF 17 and TF 11 united about 300 nmi (350 mi; 560 km) northwest of New Caledonia (16°16′S 162°20′E). Fletcher immediately detached TF 11 to refuel from the oiler Tippecanoe, while TF 17 refueled from Neosho. TF 17 completed refueling the next day, but TF 11 reported that they would not be finished fueling until 4 May. Fletcher elected to take TF 17 northwest towards the Louisiades and ordered TF 11 to meet TF 44, which was en route from Sydney and Nouméa, on 4 May once refueling was complete. TF 44 was a joint Australia–US warship force under MacArthur's command, led by Australian Rear Admiral John Crace and made up of the cruisers HMAS Australia, Hobart, and USS Chicago, along with three destroyers. Once it completed refueling TF 11, Tippecanoe departed the Coral Sea to deliver its remaining fuel to Allied ships at Efate.

=== Tulagi ===
Early on 3 May, Shima's force arrived off Tulagi and began disembarking the naval troops to occupy the island. Tulagi was undefended: the small garrison of Australian commandos and a Royal Australian Air Force reconnaissance unit evacuated just before Shima's arrival. The Japanese forces immediately began construction of a seaplane and communications base. Aircraft from Shōhō covered the landings until early afternoon, when Gotō's force turned towards Bougainville to refuel in preparation to support the landings at Port Moresby.

At 17:00 on 3 May, Fletcher was notified that the Japanese Tulagi invasion force had been sighted the day before, approaching the southern Solomons. Unknown to Fletcher, TF 11 completed refueling that morning ahead of schedule and was only 60 nmi (69 mi; 110 km) east of TF 17, but was unable to communicate its status because of Fletcher's orders to maintain radio silence. TF 17 changed course and proceeded at 27 kn (31 mph; 50 km/h) towards Guadalcanal to launch airstrikes against the Japanese forces at Tulagi the next morning.

On 4 May, from a position 100 nmi (120 mi; 190 km) south of Guadalcanal (11°10′S 158°49′E), a total of 60 aircraft from TF 17 launched three consecutive strikes against Shima's forces off Tulagi. Yorktown's aircraft surprised Shima's ships and sank the destroyer Kikuzuki (09°07′S 160°12′E) and three of the minesweepers, damaged four other ships, and destroyed four seaplanes which were supporting the landings. The US lost one torpedo bomber and two fighters in the strikes, but all of the aircrew were eventually rescued. After recovering its aircraft late in the evening of 4 May, TF 17 retired towards the south. In spite of the damage suffered in the carrier strikes, the Japanese continued construction of the seaplane base and began flying reconnaissance missions from Tulagi by 6 May.

Takagi's Carrier Striking Force was refueling 350 nmi (400 mi; 650 km) north of Tulagi when it received word of Fletcher's strike on 4 May. Takagi terminated refueling, headed southeast, and sent scout planes to search east of the Solomons, believing the US carriers were in that area. Since no Allied ships were in that area, the search planes found nothing.

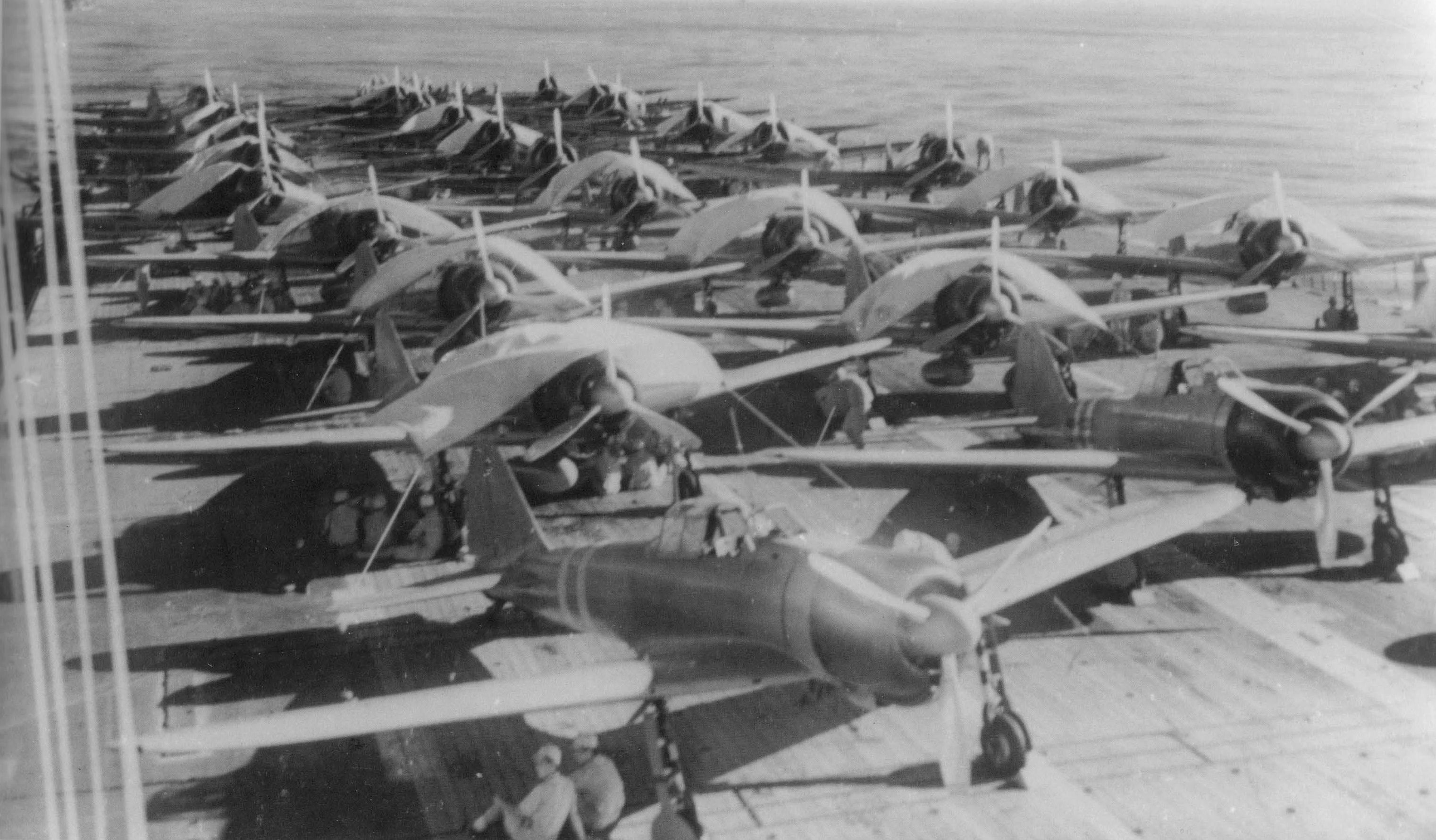
Zuikaku crewmen service aircraft on the carrier's flight deck on 5 May

=== Air searches and decisions ===
At 08:16 on 5 May, TF 17 rendezvoused with TF 11 and TF 44 at a predetermined point 320 nmi (370 mi; 590 km) south of Guadalcanal (15°S 160°E). At about the same time, four Grumman F4F Wildcat fighters from Yorktown intercepted a Kawanishi H6K reconnaissance flying boat from the Yokohama Air Group of the 25th Air Flotilla based at the Shortland Islands and shot it down 11 nmi (13 mi; 20 km) from TF 11. The aircraft failed to send a report before it crashed, but when it did not return to base the Japanese correctly assumed that it had been shot down by carrier aircraft.

A message from Pearl Harbor notified Fletcher that radio intelligence deduced the Japanese planned to land their troops at Port Moresby on 10 May and their fleet carriers would likely be operating close to the invasion convoy. Armed with this information, Fletcher directed TF 17 to refuel from Neosho. After the refueling was completed on 6 May, he planned to take his forces north towards the Louisiades and do battle on 7 May.

In the meantime, Takagi's carrier force steamed down the east side of the Solomons throughout the day on 5 May, turned west to pass south of San Cristobal (Makira), and entered the Coral Sea after transiting between Guadalcanal and Rennell Island in the early morning hours of 6 May. Takagi commenced refueling his ships 180 nmi (210 mi; 330 km) west of Tulagi in preparation for the carrier battle he expected would take place the next day.

On 6 May, Fletcher absorbed TF 11 and TF 44 into TF 17. Believing the Japanese carriers were still well to the north near Bougainville, Fletcher continued to refuel. Reconnaissance patrols conducted from the US carriers throughout the day failed to locate any of the Japanese naval forces, because they were located just beyond scouting range.

At 10:00, a Kawanishi reconnaissance flying boat from Tulagi sighted TF 17 and notified its headquarters. Takagi received the report at 10:50. At that time, Takagi's force was about 300 nmi (350 mi; 560 km) north of Fletcher, near the maximum range for his carrier aircraft. Takagi, whose ships were still refueling, was not yet ready to engage in battle. He concluded, based on the sighting report, TF 17 was heading south and increasing the range. Furthermore, Fletcher's ships were under a large, low-hanging overcast which Takagi and Hara felt would make it difficult for their aircraft to find the US carriers. Takagi detached his two carriers with two destroyers under Hara's command to head towards TF 17 at 20 kn (23 mph; 37 km/h) in order to be in position to attack at first light the next day while the rest of his ships completed refueling.

Animated map of the battle, 6–8 May

US B-17 bombers based in Australia and staging through Port Moresby attacked the approaching Port Moresby invasion forces, including Gotō's warships, several times during the day on 6 May without success. MacArthur's headquarters radioed Fletcher with reports of the attacks and the locations of the Japanese invasion forces. MacArthur's fliers' reports of seeing a carrier (Shōhō) about 425 nmi (489 mi; 787 km) northwest of TF 17 further convinced Fletcher fleet carriers were accompanying the invasion force.

At 18:00, TF 17 completed fueling and Fletcher detached Neosho with a destroyer, Sims, to take station further south at a prearranged rendezvous (16°S 158°E). TF 17 then turned to head northwest towards Rossel Island in the Louisiades. Unbeknownst to the two adversaries, their carriers were only 70 nmi (130 km) away from each other by 20:00 that night. At 20:00 (13°20′S 157°40′E), Hara reversed course to meet Takagi who completed refueling and was now heading in Hara's direction.

Late on 6 May or early on 7 May, Kamikawa Maru set up a seaplane base in the Deboyne Islands in order to help provide air support for the invasion forces as they approached Port Moresby. The rest of Marumo's Cover Force then took station near the D'Entrecasteaux Islands to help screen Abe's oncoming convoy.

=== Carrier battle, first day ===
==== Morning strikes ====
At 06:25 on 7 May, TF 17 was 115 nmi (132 mi; 213 km) south of Rossel Island (13°20′S 154°21′E). At this time, Fletcher sent Crace's cruiser force, now designated Task Group 17.3 (TG 17.3), to block the Jomard Passage. Fletcher understood that Crace would be operating without air cover since TF 17's carriers would be busy trying to locate and attack the Japanese carriers. Detaching Crace reduced the anti-aircraft defenses for Fletcher's carriers. Nevertheless, Fletcher decided the risk was necessary to ensure the Japanese invasion forces could not slip through to Port Moresby while he engaged the carriers.

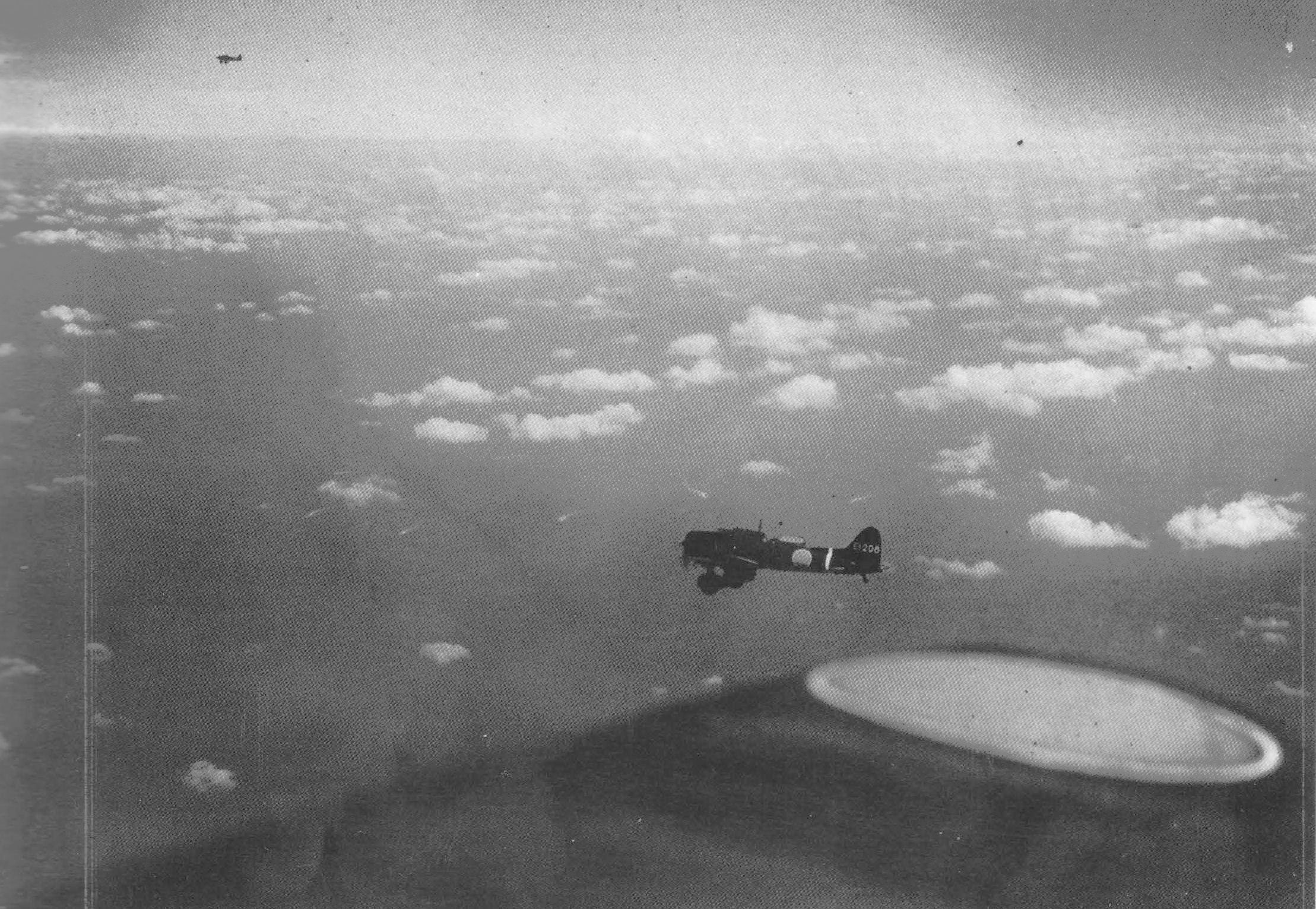
Japanese carrier dive bombers head towards the reported position of US carriers on 7 May.

Believing Takagi's carrier force was somewhere north of him, in the vicinity of the Louisiades, beginning at 06:19, Fletcher directed Yorktown to send 10 Douglas SBD Dauntless dive bombers as scouts to search that area. Hara in turn believed Fletcher was south of him and advised Takagi to send the aircraft to search that area. Takagi, about 300 nmi (350 mi; 560 km) east of Fletcher (13°12′S 158°05′E), launched 12 Nakajima B5Ns at 06:00 to scout for TF 17. Around the same time, Gotō's cruisers Kinugasa and Furutaka launched four Kawanishi E7K2 Type 94 floatplanes to search southeast of the Louisiades. Augmenting their search were several floatplanes from Deboyne, four Kawanishi H6Ks from Tulagi, and three Mitsubishi G4M bombers from Rabaul. Each side readied the rest of its carrier attack aircraft to launch immediately once the enemy was located.

At 07:22 one of Takagi's carrier scouts, from Shōkaku, reported US ships bearing 182° (just west of due south), 163 nmi (188 mi; 302 km) from Takagi. At 07:45, the scout confirmed that it had located "one carrier, one cruiser, and three destroyers". Another Shōkaku scout aircraft quickly confirmed the sighting. The Shōkaku aircraft actually sighted and misidentified the oiler Neosho and destroyer Sims, which had earlier been detailed away from the fleet to a southern rendezvous point. Believing that he had located the US carriers, Hara, with Takagi's concurrence, immediately launched all of his available aircraft. A total of 78 aircraft—18 Zero fighters, 36 Aichi D3A dive bombers, and 24 torpedo aircraft—began launching from Shōkaku and Zuikaku at 08:00 and were on their way by 08:15 towards the reported sighting. The strike force was under overall command of Lieutenant Commander Kakuichi Takahashi, while Lieutenant Commander Shigekazu Shimazaki led its torpedo bombers.

At 08:20, one of the Furutaka aircraft found Fletcher's carriers and immediately reported it to Inoue's headquarters at Rabaul, which passed the report on to Takagi. The sighting was confirmed by a Kinugasa floatplane at 08:30. Takagi and Hara, confused by the conflicting sighting reports they were receiving, decided to continue with the strike on the ships to their south, but turned their carriers towards the northwest to close the distance with Furutaka's reported contact. Takagi and Hara considered that the conflicting reports might mean that the US carrier forces were operating in two separate groups.

At 08:15, a Yorktown SBD piloted by John L. Nielsen sighted Gotō's force screening the invasion convoy. Nielsen, making an error in his coded message, reported the sighting as "two carriers and four heavy cruisers" at 10°3′S 152°27′E, 225 nmi (259 mi; 417 km) northwest of TF17. Fletcher concluded that the Japanese main carrier force was located and ordered the launch of all available carrier aircraft to attack. By 10:13, the US strike of 93 aircraft—18 Grumman F4F Wildcats, 53 Douglas SBD Dauntless dive bombers, and 22 Douglas TBD Devastator torpedo bombers—was on its way. At 10:19, Nielsen landed and discovered his coding error. Although Gotō's force included the light carrier Shōhō, Nielsen thought that he saw two cruisers and four destroyers and thus the main fleet. At 10:12, Fletcher received a report of an aircraft carrier, ten transports, and 16 warships 30 nmi (35 mi; 56 km) south of Nielsen's sighting at 10°35′S 152°36′E. The B-17s actually saw the same thing as Nielsen: Shōhō, Gotō's cruisers, plus the Port Moresby Invasion Force. Believing that the B-17's sighting was the main Japanese carrier force (which was in fact well to the east), Fletcher directed the airborne strike force towards this target.

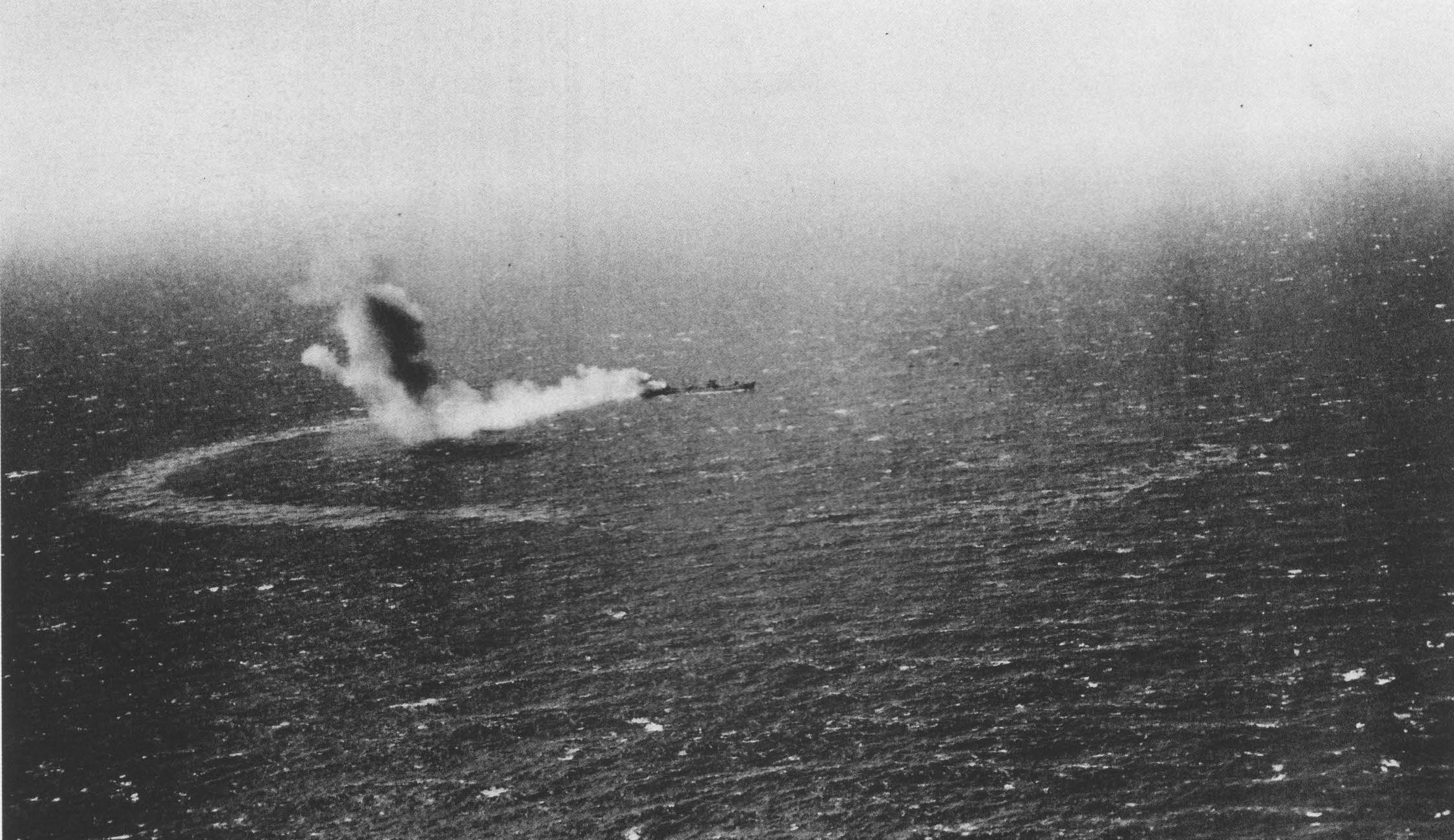
USS Neosho is left burning and slowly sinking at the completion of the Japanese dive bombing attack.

At 09:15, Takahashi's strike force reached its target area, sighted Neosho and Sims, and searched in vain for the US carriers for a couple of hours. Finally, at 10:51 Shōkaku scout aircrews realized they were mistaken in their identification of the oiler and destroyer as aircraft carriers. Takagi now realized the US carriers were between him and the invasion convoy, placing the invasion forces in extreme danger. At 11:15, the torpedo bombers and fighters abandoned the mission and headed back towards the carriers with their ordnance, while the 36 dive bombers attacked the two US ships.

Four dive bombers attacked Sims and the rest dived on Neosho. The destroyer was hit by three bombs, broke in half, and sank immediately, killing all but 14 of her 192-man crew. Neosho was hit by seven bombs. One of the dive bombers, hit by anti-aircraft fire, crashed into the oiler. Heavily damaged and without power, Neosho was left drifting and slowly sinking (16°09′S 158°03′E). Before losing power, Neosho was able to notify Fletcher by radio that she was under attack and in trouble, but garbled any further details as to just who or what was attacking her and gave wrong coordinates (16°25′S 157°31′E) for her position.

The US strike aircraft sighted Shōhō a short distance northeast of Misima Island at 10:40 and deployed to attack. The Japanese carrier was protected by four Zeros and two Mitsubishi A5M fighters flying combat air patrol (CAP), as the rest of the carrier's aircraft were being prepared below decks for a strike against the US carriers. Gotō's cruisers surrounded the carrier in a diamond formation, 3,000–5,000 yd (2,700–4,600 m) off each of Shōhō's corners.

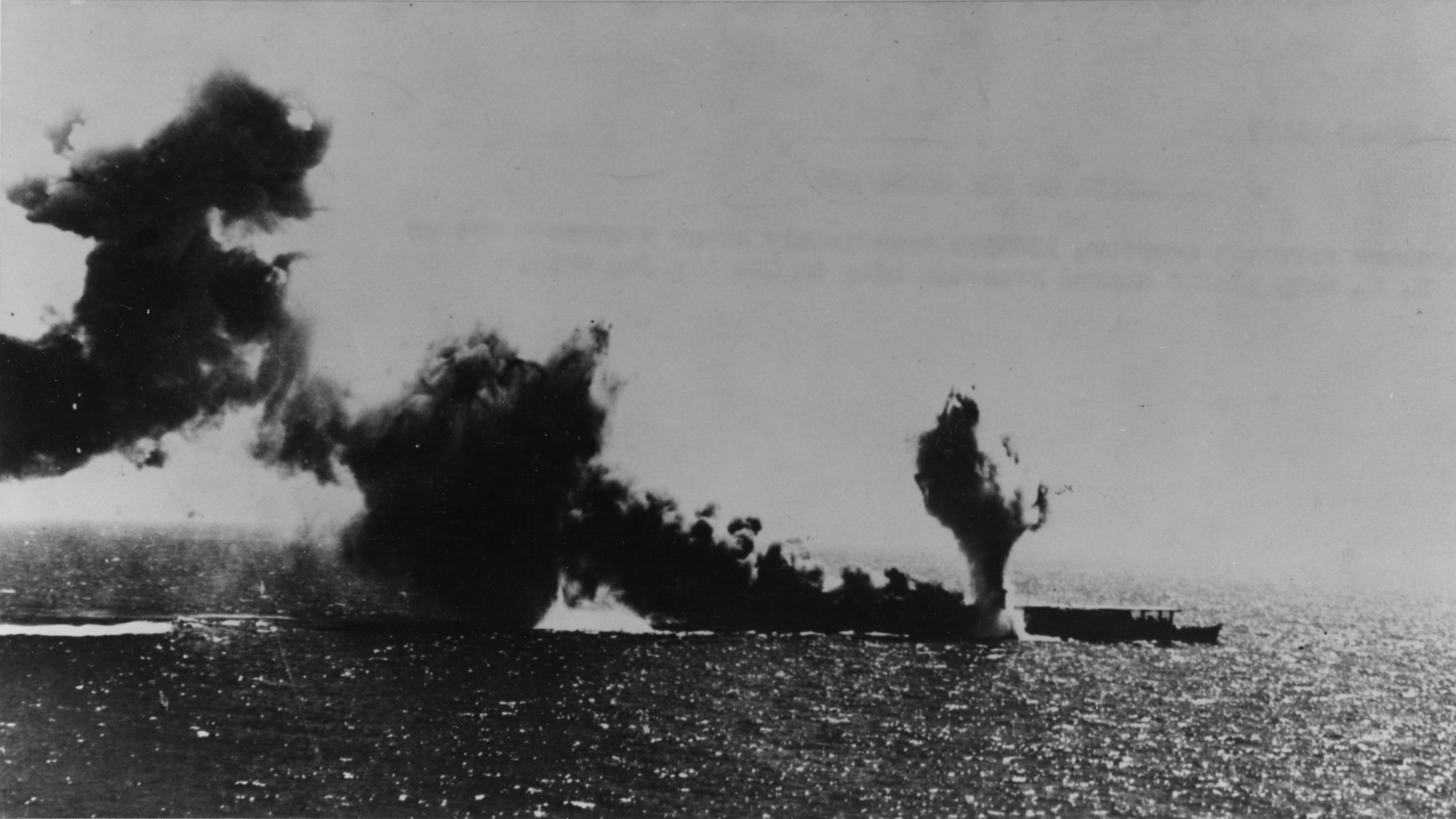
Shōhō is bombed and torpedoed by US carrier aircraft.

Attacking first, Lexington's air group, led by Commander William B. Ault, hit Shōhō with two 1,000 lb (450 kg) bombs and five torpedoes, causing severe damage. At 11:00, Yorktown's air group attacked the burning and now almost stationary carrier, scoring with up to 11 more 1,000 lb (450 kg) bombs and at least two torpedoes. Torn apart, Shōhō sank at 11:35 (10°29′S 152°55′E). Fearing more air attacks, Gotō withdrew his warships to the north, but sent the destroyer Sazanami back at 14:00 to rescue survivors. Only 203 of the carrier's 834-man crew were recovered. Three US aircraft were lost in the attack: two SBDs from Lexington and one from Yorktown. All of Shōhō's aircraft complement of 18 was lost, but three of the CAP fighter pilots were able to ditch at Deboyne and survived. At 12:10, using a prearranged message to signal TF 17 on the success of the mission, Lexington SBD pilot and squadron commander Robert E. Dixon radioed "Scratch one flat top! Signed Bob."

==== Afternoon operations ====
The US aircraft returned and landed on their carriers by 13:38. By 14:20, the aircraft were rearmed and ready to launch against the Port Moresby Invasion Force or Gotō's cruisers. Fletcher was concerned that the locations of the rest of the Japanese fleet carriers were still unknown. He was informed that Allied intelligence sources believed that up to four Japanese carriers might be supporting the MO operation. Fletcher concluded that by the time his scout aircraft found the remaining carriers it would be too late in the day to mount a strike. Thus, Fletcher decided to hold off on another strike this day and remain concealed under the thick overcast with fighters ready in defense. Fletcher turned TF 17 southwest.

Apprised of the loss of Shōhō, Inoue ordered the invasion convoy to temporarily withdraw to the north and ordered Takagi, at this time located 225 nmi (259 mi; 417 km) east of TF 17, to destroy the US carrier forces. As the invasion convoy reversed course, it was bombed by eight US Army B-17s, but was not damaged. Gotō and Kajioka were told to assemble their ships south of Rossel Island for a night surface battle if the US ships came within range.

At 12:40, a Deboyne-based seaplane sighted and reported Crace's detached cruiser and destroyer force on a bearing of 175°, 78 nmi (90 mi; 144 km) from Deboyne. At 13:15, an aircraft from Rabaul sighted Crace's force but submitted an erroneous report, stating the force contained two carriers and was located, bearing 205°, 115 nmi (213 km) from Deboyne. Based on these reports, Takagi, who was still awaiting the return of all of his aircraft from attacking Neosho, turned his carriers due west at 13:30 and advised Inoue at 15:00 that the US carriers were at least 430 nmi (490 mi; 800 km) west of his location and that he would therefore be unable to attack them that day.

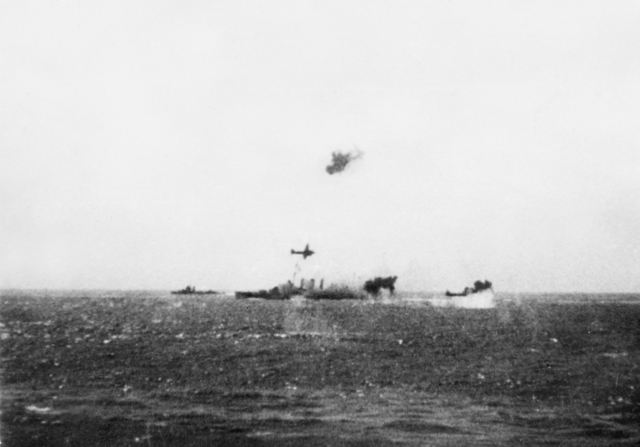
HMAS Australia (center) and TG17.3 under air attack on 7 May

Inoue's staff directed two groups of attack aircraft from Rabaul, already airborne since that morning, towards Crace's reported position. The first group included 12 torpedo-armed G4M bombers and the second group comprised 19 Mitsubishi G3M land attack aircraft armed with bombs. Both groups found and attacked Crace's ships at 14:30 and claimed to have sunk a "California-type" battleship and damaged another battleship and cruiser. In reality, Crace's ships were lightly damaged and shot down four G4Ms. A short time later, three US Army B-17s mistakenly bombed Crace, but caused no damage. At the conclusion of the attack, the detachment of cruisers suffered several wounded and a few men killed aboard the Chicago.

Crace at 15:26 radioed Fletcher he could not complete his mission without air support. Crace retired southward to a position about 220 nmi (250 mi; 410 km) southeast of Port Moresby to increase the range from Japanese carrier or land-based aircraft while remaining close enough to intercept any Japanese naval forces advancing beyond the Louisiades through either the Jomard Passage or the China Strait. Crace's ships were low on fuel, and as Fletcher was maintaining radio silence (and had not informed him in advance), Crace had no idea of Fletcher's location, status, or intentions.

Shortly after 15:00, Zuikaku monitored a message from a Deboyne-based reconnaissance aircraft reporting (incorrectly) that Crace's force had altered course to 120° true (southeast). Takagi's staff assumed the aircraft was shadowing Fletcher's carriers and determined if the Allied ships held that course, they would be within striking range shortly before nightfall. Takagi and Hara were determined to attack immediately with a select group of aircraft, minus fighter escort, even though it meant the strike would return after dark.

To try to confirm the location of the US carriers, at 15:15 Hara sent a flight of eight torpedo bombers as scouts to sweep 200 nmi (230 mi; 370 km) westward. About that same time, the dive bombers that had attacked Neosho returned and landed. Six of the weary dive bomber pilots were told they would be immediately departing on another mission. Choosing his most experienced crews, including Takahashi, Shimazaki and Lieutenant Tamotsu Ema, at 16:15 Hara launched 12 dive bombers and 15 torpedo planes with orders to fly on a heading of 277° to 280 nmi (320 mi; 520 km). The eight scout aircraft reached the end of their 200 nmi (230 mi; 370 km) search leg and turned back without seeing Fletcher's ships.

At 17:47, TF 17—operating under thick overcast 200 nmi (230 mi; 370 km) west of Takagi—detected the Japanese strike on radar heading in their direction, turned southeast into the wind, and vectored 11 CAP Wildcats, led by Lieutenant Commanders Paul H. Ramsey and James H. Flatley, to intercept. Taking the Japanese formation by surprise, the Wildcats shot down seven torpedo bombers and one dive bomber, and heavily damaged another torpedo bomber (which later crashed), at a cost of three Wildcats lost.

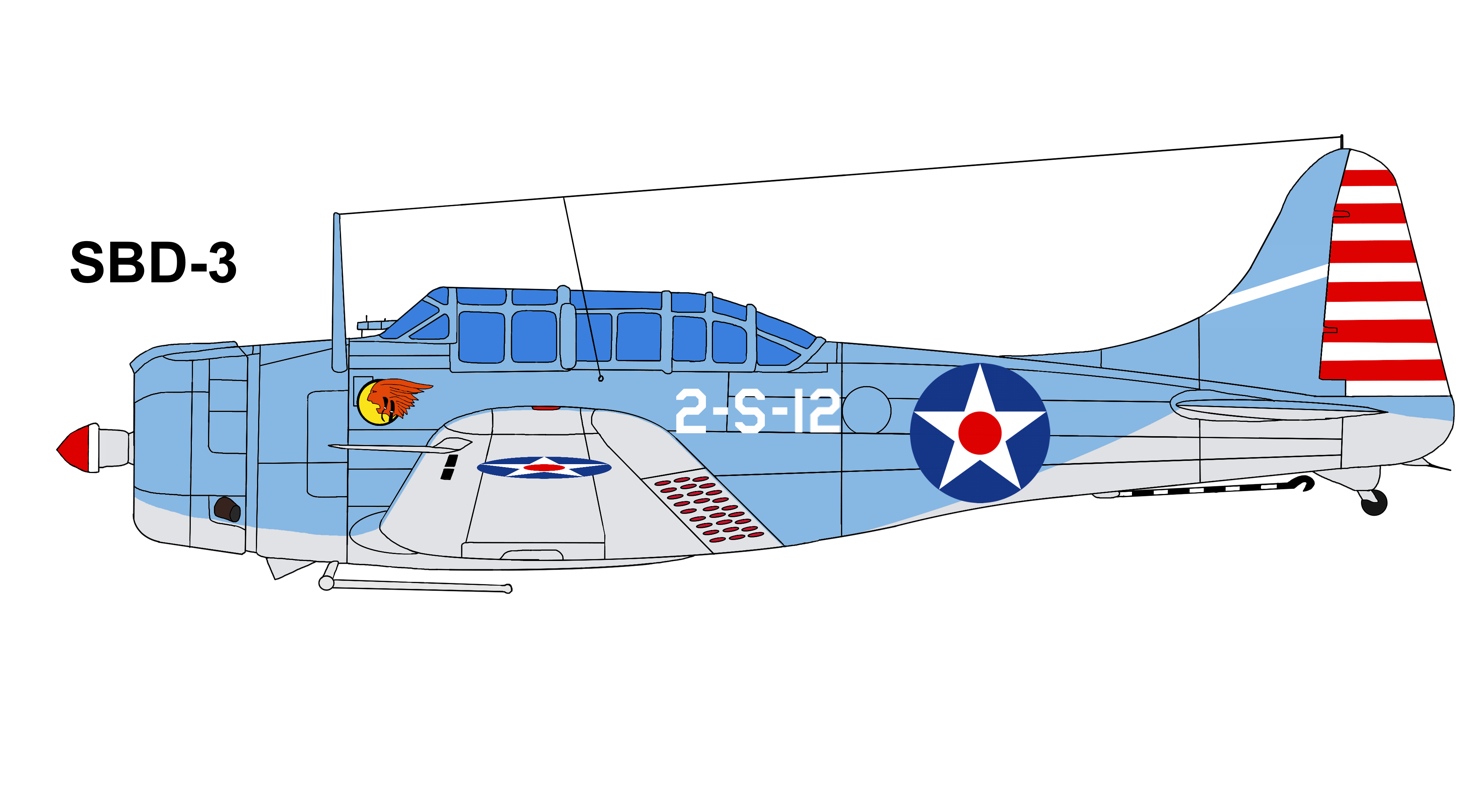
2-S-12 from Scouting Squadron 2 on board the USS Lexington

Having taken heavy losses in the attack, which also scattered their formations, the Japanese strike leaders canceled the mission after conferring by radio. The Japanese aircraft all jettisoned their ordnance and reversed course to return to their carriers. The sun set at 18:30. Several of the Japanese dive bombers encountered the US carriers in the darkness, around 19:00, and briefly confused as to their identity, circled in preparation for landing before anti-aircraft fire from TF 17's destroyers drove them away. By 20:00, TF 17 and Takagi were about 100 nmi (120 mi; 190 km) apart. Takagi turned on his warships' searchlights to help guide the 18 surviving aircraft back and all were recovered by 22:00.

In the meantime, at 15:18 and 17:18 Neosho was able to radio TF 17 she was drifting northwest in dire straits. Neosho's 17:18 report gave wrong coordinates, which hampered subsequent US rescue efforts to locate the oiler. More significantly, the news informed Fletcher his only nearby available fuel supply was gone.

As nightfall ended aircraft operations for the day, Fletcher ordered TF 17 to head west and prepared to launch a 360° search at first light. Crace also turned west to stay within striking range of the Louisiades. Inoue directed Takagi to make sure he destroyed the US carriers the next day, and postponed the Port Moresby landings to 12 May. Takagi elected to take his carriers 120 nmi (140 mi; 220 km) north during the night so he could concentrate his morning search to the west and south and ensure that his carriers could provide better protection for the invasion convoy. Gotō and Kajioka were unable to position and coordinate their ships in time to attempt a night attack on the Allied warships.

Both sides expected to find each other early the next day, and spent the night preparing their strike aircraft for the anticipated battle as their exhausted aircrews attempted to get a few hours' sleep. In 1972, US Vice Admiral H. S. Duckworth, after reading Japanese records of the battle, commented, "Without a doubt, May 7, 1942, vicinity of Coral Sea, was the most confused battle area in world history." Hara later told Yamamoto's chief of staff, Admiral Matome Ugaki, he was so frustrated with the "poor luck" the Japanese experienced on 7 May that he felt like quitting the navy.

=== Carrier battle, second day ===
==== Attack on the Japanese carriers ====
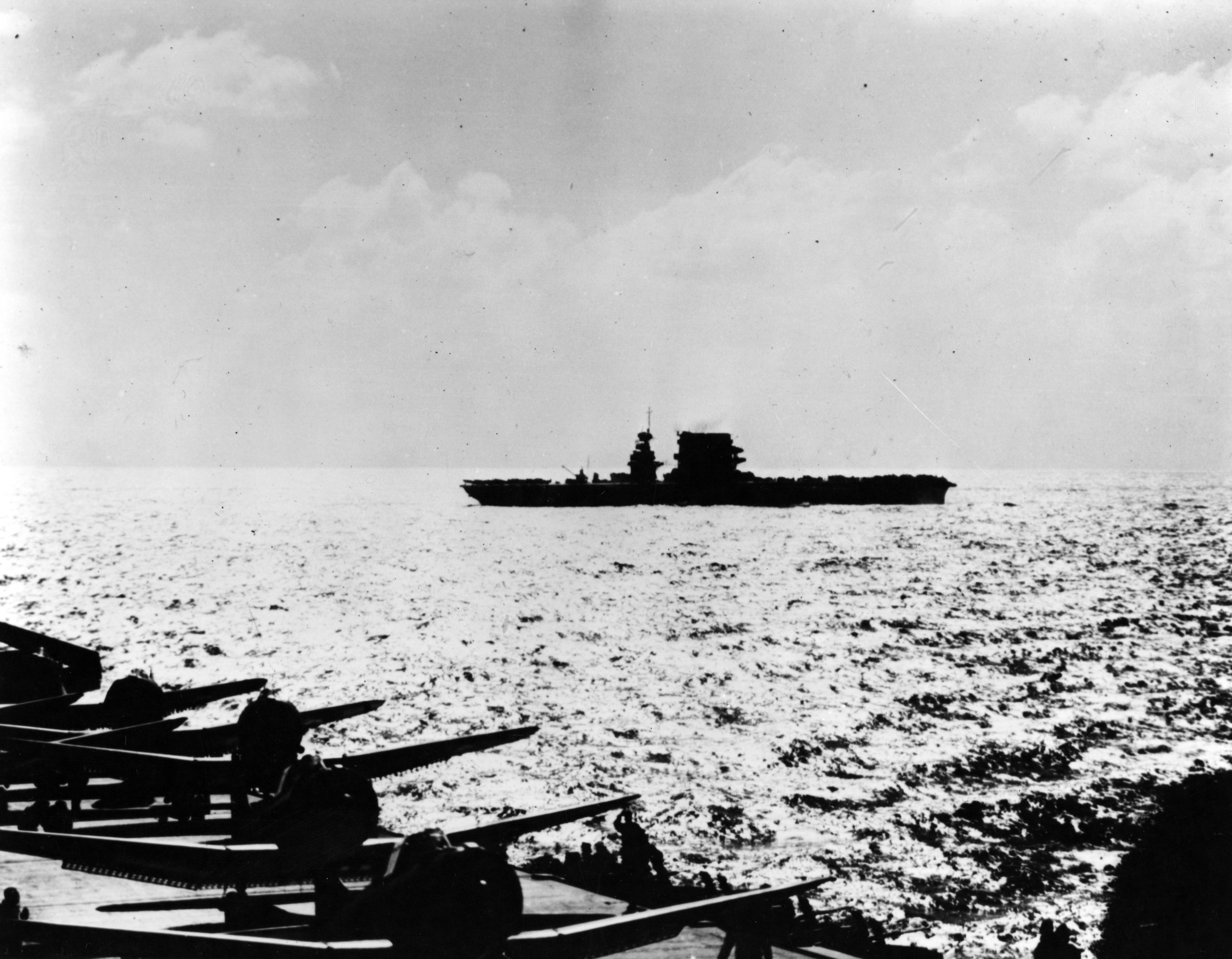
Yorktown (foreground) and Lexington turn to launch aircraft under clear skies on 8 May.

At 06:15 on 8 May, from a position 100 nmi (120 mi; 190 km) east of Rossel Island (10°25′S 154°5′E), Hara launched seven torpedo bombers to search the area bearing 140–230°, out to 250 nmi (290 mi; 460 km) from the Japanese carriers. Assisting in the search were three Kawanishi H6Ks from Tulagi and four G4M bombers from Rabaul. At 07:00, the carrier striking force turned to the southwest and was joined by two of Gotō's cruisers, Kinugasa and Furutaka, for additional screening support. The invasion convoy, Gotō, and Kajioka steered towards a rendezvous point 40 nmi (46 mi; 74 km) east of Woodlark Island to await the outcome of the carrier battle. During the night, the warm frontal zone with low clouds which had helped hide the US carriers on 7 May moved north and east and now covered the Japanese carriers, limiting visibility to between 2 and 15 nmi (2.3 and 17.3 mi; 3.7 and 27.8 km).

At 06:35, TF 17—operating under Fitch's tactical control and positioned 180 nmi (210 mi; 330 km) southeast of the Louisiades, launched 18 SBDs to conduct a 360° search out to 200 nmi (230 mi; 370 km). The skies over the US carriers were mostly clear, with 17 nmi (20 mi; 31 km) visibility.

At 08:20, a Lexington SBD piloted by Joseph G. Smith spotted the Japanese carriers through a hole in the clouds and notified TF 17. Two minutes later, a Shōkaku search plane commanded by Kenzō Kanno sighted TF 17 and notified Hara. The two forces were about 210 nmi (240 mi; 390 km) apart. Both sides raced to launch their strike aircraft.

At 09:15, the Japanese carriers launched a combined strike of 18 fighters, 33 dive bombers, and 18 torpedo planes, commanded by Takahashi, with Shimazaki again leading the torpedo bombers. The US carriers each launched a separate strike. Yorktown's group consisted of 6 fighters, 24 dive bombers, and 9 torpedo planes and was on its way by 09:15. Lexington's group of 9 fighters, 15 dive bombers, and 12 torpedo planes was off at 09:25. Both the US and Japanese carrier warship forces turned to head directly for each other's location at high speed in order to shorten the distance their aircraft would have to fly on their return legs.

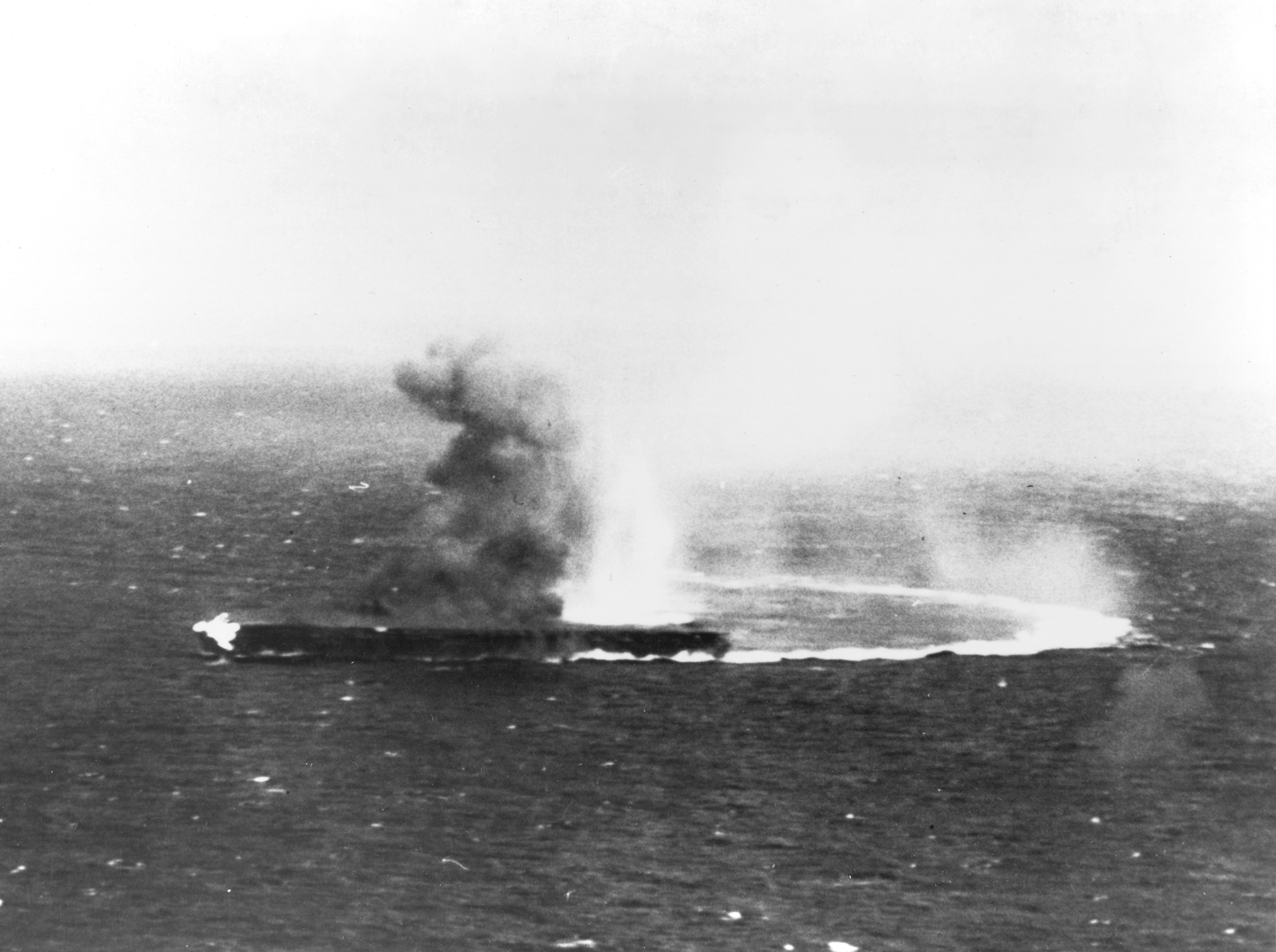
Shōkaku, at high speed and turning hard, afire after bomb strikes

Yorktown's dive bombers, led by William O. Burch, reached the Japanese carriers at 10:32, and paused to allow the slower torpedo squadron to arrive so that they could conduct a simultaneous attack. At this time, Shōkaku and Zuikaku were about 10,000 yd (9,100 m) apart, with Zuikaku hidden under a rain squall of low-hanging clouds. The two carriers were protected by 16 CAP Zero fighters. The Yorktown dive bombers commenced their attacks at 10:57 on Shōkaku and hit the radically maneuvering carrier with two 1,000 lb (450 kg) bombs, tearing open the forecastle and causing heavy damage to the carrier's flight and hangar decks. The Yorktown torpedo planes missed with all of their ordnance. Two US dive bombers and two CAP Zeros were shot down during the attack.

Lexington's aircraft arrived and attacked at 11:30. Two dive bombers attacked Shōkaku, hitting the carrier with one 1,000 lb (450 kg) bomb, causing further damage. Two other dive bombers dove on Zuikaku, missing with their bombs. The rest of Lexington's dive bombers were unable to find the Japanese carriers in the heavy clouds. Lexington's TBDs missed Shōkaku with all 11 of their torpedoes. The 13 CAP Zeros on patrol at this time shot down 3 Wildcats.

With her flight deck heavily damaged and 223 of her crew killed or wounded, having also suffered explosions in her gasoline storage tanks and an engine repair workshop destroyed, Shōkaku was unable to conduct further aircraft operations. Her captain, Takatsugu Jōjima, requested permission from Takagi and Hara to withdraw from the battle, to which Takagi agreed. At 12:10, Shōkaku, accompanied by two destroyers, retired to the northeast.

==== Attack on the US carriers ====
At 10:55, Lexington's CXAM-1 radar detected the inbound Japanese aircraft at a range of 68 nmi (78 mi; 126 km) and vectored nine Wildcats to intercept. Expecting the Japanese torpedo bombers to be at a much lower altitude than they actually were, six of the Wildcats were stationed too low, and thus missed the Japanese aircraft as they passed by overhead. Because of the heavy losses in aircraft suffered the night before, the Japanese could not execute a full torpedo attack on both carriers. Lieutenant Commander Shigekazu Shimazaki, commanding the Japanese torpedo planes, sent 14 to attack Lexington and 4 to attack Yorktown. A Wildcat shot down one and patrolling SBDs (8 from Yorktown, 15 from Lexington) destroyed 3 more as the Japanese torpedo planes descended to take attack position. In return, escorting Zeros shot down 4 Yorktown SBDs. One of the survivors, Swede Vejtasa, claimed 3 Zeros during the onslaught (though none were lost).

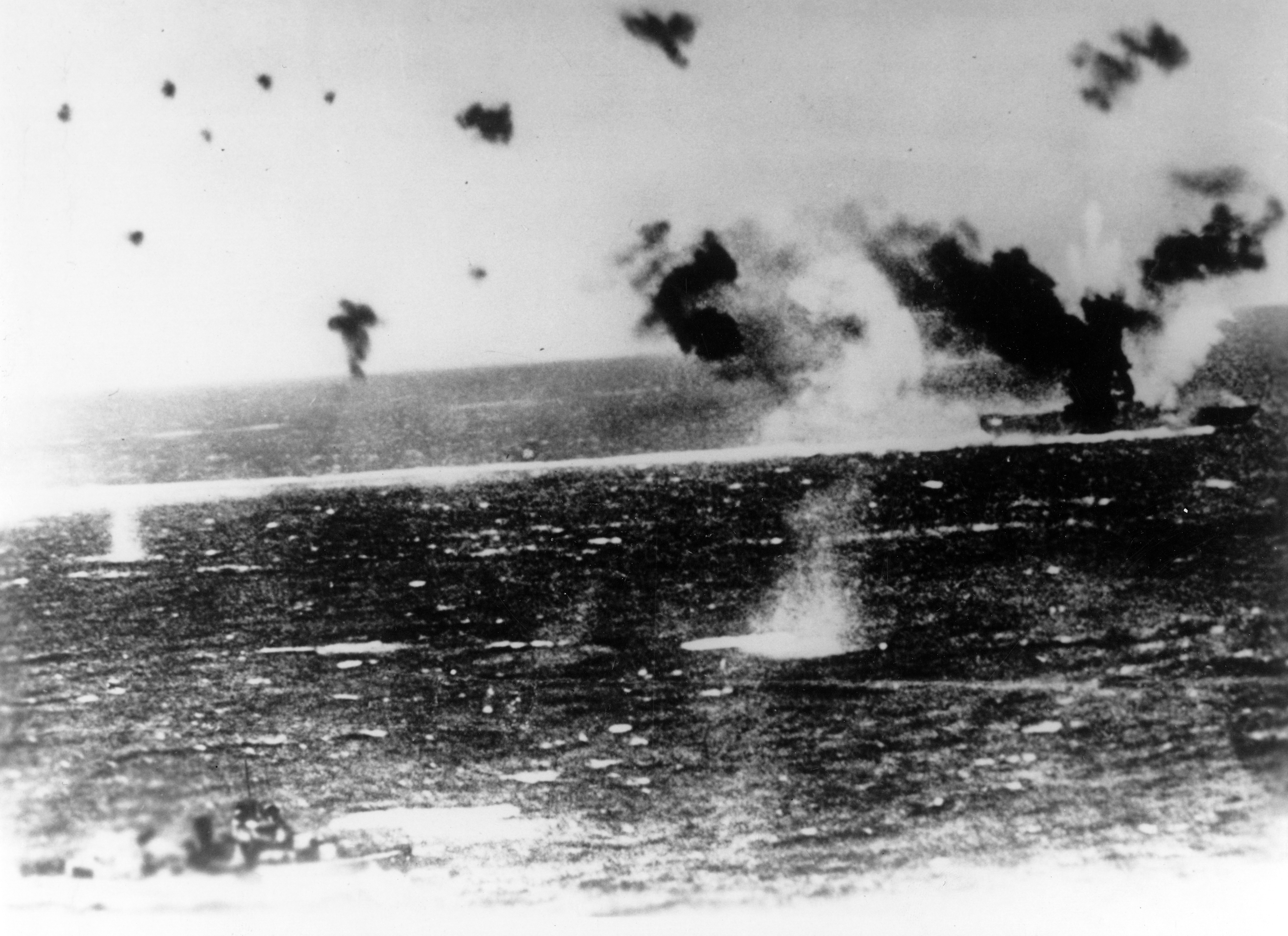
Lexington (center right), afire and under heavy attack, in a photograph taken from a Japanese aircraft

The Japanese attack began at 11:13 as the carriers, stationed 3,000 yd (2,700 m) apart, and their escorts opened fire with anti-aircraft guns. The four torpedo planes which attacked Yorktown all missed. The remaining torpedo planes successfully employed a pincer attack on Lexington, which had a much larger turning radius than Yorktown, and, at 11:20, hit her with two Type 91 torpedoes. The first torpedo buckled the port aviation gasoline stowage tanks. Undetected, gasoline vapors spread into surrounding compartments. The second torpedo ruptured the port water main, reducing water pressure to the three forward firerooms and forcing the associated boilers to be shut down. The ship could still make 24 kn (28 mph; 44 km/h) with her remaining boilers. Four of the Japanese torpedo planes were shot down by anti-aircraft fire.

The 33 Japanese dive bombers circled to attack from upwind, and thus did not begin their dives from 14,000 ft (4,300 m) until three to four minutes after the torpedo planes began their attacks. The 19 Shōkaku dive bombers, under Takahashi, lined up on Lexington while the remaining 14, directed by Tamotsu Ema, attacked Yorktown. Escorting Zeros shielded Takahashi's aircraft from four Lexington CAP Wildcats which attempted to intervene, but two Wildcats circling above Yorktown were able to disrupt Ema's formation. Takahashi's bombers damaged Lexington with two bomb hits and several near misses, causing fires which were contained by 12:33. At 11:27, Yorktown was hit in the center of her flight deck by a 250 kg (550 lb), semi-armour-piercing bomb which penetrated four decks before exploding, causing severe structural damage to an aviation storage room and killing or seriously wounding 66 men, as well as damaging the superheater boilers which rendered them inoperable. Up to 12 near misses damaged Yorktown's hull below the waterline. Two of the dive bombers were shot down by a CAP Wildcat during the attack.

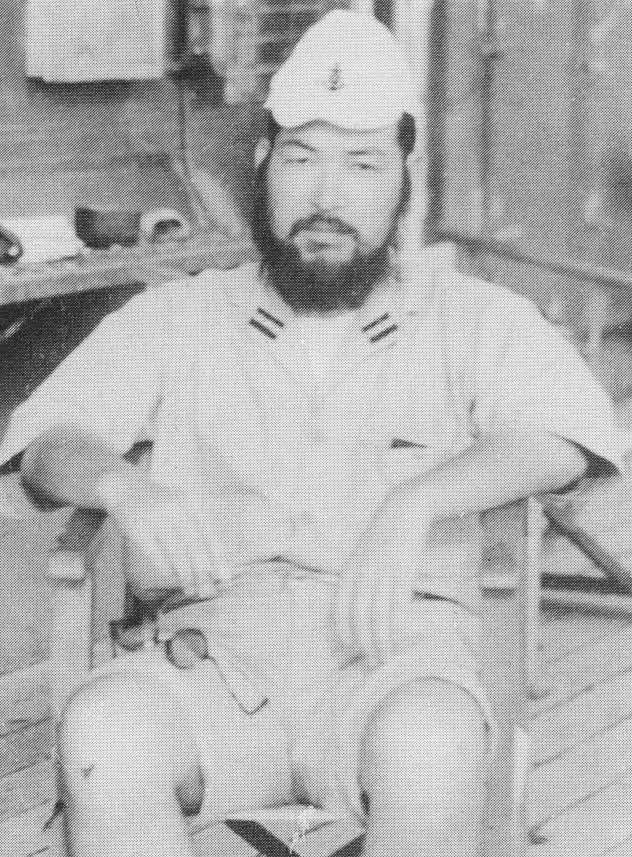
Tamotsu Ema, leader of the Zuikaku dive bombers that damaged Yorktown

As the Japanese aircraft completed their attacks and began to withdraw, believing that they had inflicted fatal damage to both carriers, they ran a gauntlet of CAP Wildcats and SBDs. In the ensuing aerial duels, three SBDs and three Wildcats for the US, and three torpedo bombers, one dive bomber, and one Zero for the Japanese were downed. By 12:00, the US and Japanese strike groups were on their way back to their respective carriers. During their return, aircraft from the two adversaries passed each other in the air, resulting in more air-to-air altercations. Kanno's and Takahashi's aircraft were shot down, killing both of them. Two future US destroyers were named after naval pilots lost in this confrontation: the USS Rinehart and USS Mason.

==== Recovery, reassessment and retreat ====
The strike forces, with many damaged aircraft, reached and landed on their respective carriers between 12:50 and 14:30. In spite of damage, Yorktown and Lexington were able to recover aircraft from their returning air groups. During recovery operations, for various reasons the US lost an additional five SBDs, two TBDs, and a Wildcat, and the Japanese lost two Zeros, five dive bombers, and one torpedo plane. Forty-six of the original sixty-nine aircraft from the Japanese strike force returned from the mission and landed on Zuikaku. Of these, three more Zeros, four dive bombers and five torpedo planes were judged damaged beyond repair and were immediately jettisoned into the sea.

As TF 17 recovered its aircraft, Fletcher assessed the situation. The returning aviators reported they heavily damaged one carrier, but that another had escaped damage. Fletcher noted that both his carriers were hurt and that his air groups had suffered high fighter losses. Fuel was also a concern due to the loss of Neosho. At 14:22, Fitch notified Fletcher that he had reports of two undamaged Japanese carriers and that this was supported by radio intercepts. Believing that he faced overwhelming Japanese carrier superiority, Fletcher elected to withdraw TF 17 from the battle. Fletcher radioed MacArthur the approximate position of the Japanese carriers and suggested that he attack with his land-based bombers.

Around 14:30, Hara informed Takagi that only 24 Zeros, 8 dive bombers, and 4 torpedo planes from the carriers were currently operational. Takagi was worried about his ships' fuel levels; his cruisers were at 50% and some of his destroyers were as low as 20%. At 15:00, Takagi notified Inoue his fliers had sunk two US carriers—Yorktown and a "Saratoga-class"—but heavy losses in aircraft meant he could not continue to provide air cover for the invasion. Inoue, whose reconnaissance aircraft sighted Crace's ships earlier that day, recalled the invasion convoy to Rabaul, postponed MO to 3 July, and ordered his forces to assemble northeast of the Solomons to begin the RY operation. Zuikaku and her escorts turned towards Rabaul while Shōkaku headed for Japan.

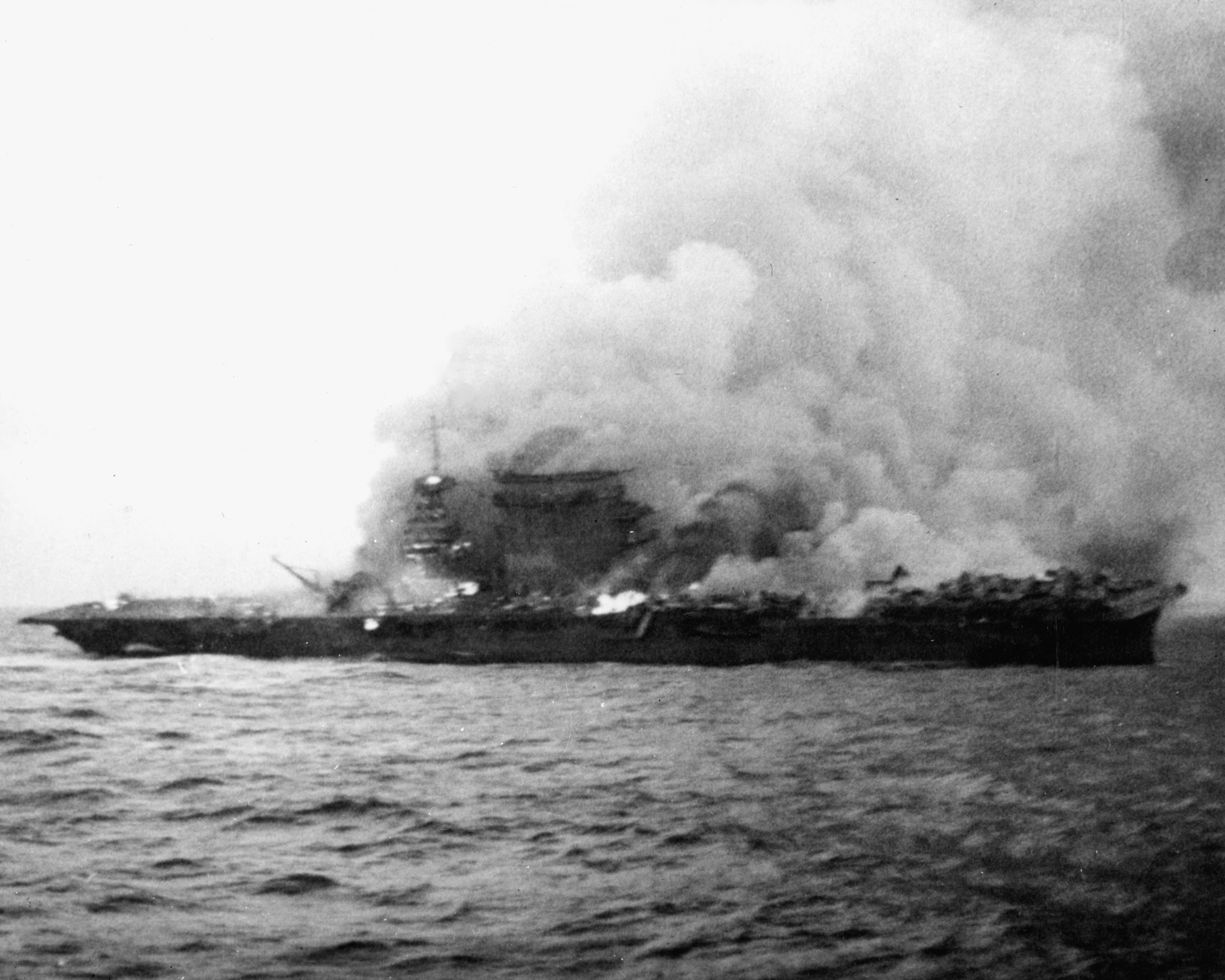
Lexington, burning and abandoned

Aboard Lexington, damage control parties put out the fires and restored her to operational condition, but at 12:47, sparks from unattended electric motors ignited gasoline fumes near the ship's central control station. The resulting explosion killed 25 men and started a large fire. Around 14:42, another large explosion occurred, starting a second severe fire. A third explosion occurred at 15:25 and at 15:38 the ship's crew reported the fires as uncontrollable. Lexington's crew began abandoning ship at 17:07. After the carrier's survivors were rescued, including Admiral Fitch and the ship's captain, Frederick C. Sherman, at 19:15 the destroyer Phelps fired five torpedoes into the burning ship, which sank in 2,400 fathoms at 19:52 (15°15′S 155°35′E). Two hundred and sixteen of the carrier's 2,951-man crew went down with the ship, along with 36 aircraft. Phelps and the other assisting warships left immediately to rejoin Yorktown and her escorts, which departed at 16:01, and TF 17 retired to the southwest. Later that evening, MacArthur informed Fletcher that eight of his B-17s had attacked the invasion convoy and that it was retiring to the northwest.

That evening, Crace detached Hobart, which was critically low on fuel, and the destroyer Walke, which was having engine trouble, to proceed to Townsville. Crace overheard radio reports saying the enemy invasion convoy had turned back, but, unaware Fletcher had withdrawn, he remained on patrol with the rest of TG 17.3 in the Coral Sea in case the Japanese invasion force resumed its advance towards Port Moresby.

== Aftermath ==
On 9 May, TF 17 altered course to the east and proceeded out of the Coral Sea via a route south of New Caledonia. Nimitz ordered Fletcher to return Yorktown to Pearl Harbor as soon as possible after refueling at Tongatabu. During the day, US Army bombers attacked Deboyne and Kamikawa Maru, inflicting unknown damage. In the meantime, having heard nothing from Fletcher, Crace deduced that TF17 had departed the area. At 01:00 on 10 May, hearing no further reports of Japanese ships advancing towards Port Moresby, Crace turned towards Australia and arrived at Cid Harbor, 130 nmi (150 mi; 240 km) south of Townsville, on 11 May.

At 22:00 on 8 May, Yamamoto ordered Inoue to turn his forces around, destroy the remaining Allied warships, and complete the invasion of Port Moresby. Inoue did not cancel the recall of the invasion convoy, but ordered Takagi and Gotō to pursue the remaining Allied warship forces in the Coral Sea. Critically low on fuel, Takagi's warships spent most of 9 May refueling from the fleet oiler Tōhō Maru. Late in the evening of 9 May, Takagi and Gotō headed southeast, then southwest into the Coral Sea. Seaplanes from Deboyne assisted Takagi in searching for TF 17 on the morning of 10 May. Fletcher and Crace were already well on their way out of the area. At 13:00 on 10 May, Takagi concluded that the enemy was gone and decided to turn back towards Rabaul. Yamamoto concurred with Takagi's decision and ordered Zuikaku to return to Japan to replenish her air groups. At the same time, Kamikawa Maru packed up and departed Deboyne. At noon on 11 May, a US Navy PBY on patrol from Nouméa sighted the drifting Neosho (15°35′S 155°36′E). The US destroyer Henley responded and rescued 109 Neosho and 14 Sims survivors later that day, then scuttled the tanker with gunfire.

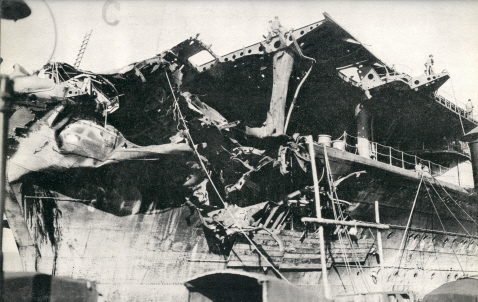
Bomb damage to Shōkaku's bow and forward flight deck

On 10 May, Operation RY commenced. After the operation's flagship, minelayer Okinoshima, was sunk by the US submarine S-42 on 12 May (05°06′S 153°48′E), the landings were postponed until 17 May. In the meantime, Halsey's TF 16 reached the South Pacific near Efate and, on 13 May, headed north to contest the Japanese approach to Nauru and Ocean Island. On 14 May, Nimitz, having obtained intelligence concerning the Combined Fleet's upcoming operation against Midway, ordered Halsey to make sure that Japanese scout aircraft sighted his ships the next day, after which he was to return to Pearl Harbor immediately. At 10:15 on 15 May, a Kawanishi reconnaissance aircraft from Tulagi sighted TF 16 445 nmi (512 mi; 824 km) east of the Solomons. Halsey's feint worked. Fearing a carrier air attack on his exposed invasion forces, Inoue immediately canceled RY and ordered his ships back to Rabaul and Truk. On 19 May, TF 16—which returned to the Efate area to refuel—turned towards Pearl Harbor and arrived there on 26 May. Yorktown reached Pearl the following day.

Shōkaku reached Kure, Japan, on 17 May, almost capsizing en route during a storm due to her battle damage. Zuikaku arrived at Kure on 21 May, having made a brief stop at Truk on 15 May. Acting on signals intelligence, the US placed eight submarines along the projected route of the carriers' return paths to Japan, but the submarines were not able to make any attacks. Japan's Naval General Staff estimated that it would take two to three months to repair Shōkaku and replenish the carriers' air groups. Thus, both carriers would be unable to participate in Yamamoto's upcoming Midway operation. The two carriers rejoined the Combined Fleet on 14 July and were key participants in subsequent carrier battles against US forces. The five I-class submarines supporting the MO operation were retasked to support an attack on Sydney Harbour three weeks later as part of a campaign to disrupt Allied supply lines. En route to Truk the submarine I-28 was torpedoed on 17 May by the US submarine Tautog and sunk with all hands.

== Significance ==
The public on both sides were informed of victory with overstatement of enemy losses and understatement of their own—the Americans claimed to have sunk between 18 and 37 ships. In terms of actual ships lost, the Japanese won a tactical victory by sinking the US fleet carrier Lexington, an oiler, and a destroyer—41,826 long tons (42,497 t)—versus a light carrier, a destroyer, and several smaller warships—19,000 long tons (19,000 t)—sunk by the US side. Lexington represented, at that time, 25% of US carrier strength in the Pacific. (Note: The Japanese thought they sank Lexington's sister ship, Saratoga.)

From a strategic perspective, however, the battle was an Allied victory as it averted the seaborne invasion of Port Moresby, lessening the threat to the supply lines between the US and Australia. Although the withdrawal of Yorktown from the Coral Sea conceded the field, the Japanese were forced to abandon the operation that had initiated the Battle of the Coral Sea in the first place.

The battle marked the first time that a Japanese invasion force was turned back without achieving its objective, which greatly lifted the morale of the Allies after a series of defeats by the Japanese during the initial six months of the Pacific Theatre. Port Moresby was vital to Allied strategy and its garrison could well have been overwhelmed by the experienced Japanese invasion troops. The US Navy also exaggerated the damage it inflicted, which later caused the press to treat its reports of Midway with more caution.

The results of the battle had a substantial effect on the strategic planning of both sides. Without a hold in New Guinea, the subsequent Allied advance, arduous as it was, would have been even more difficult. For the Japanese, who focused on the tactical results, the battle was seen as merely a temporary setback. The results of the battle confirmed the low opinion held by the Japanese of US fighting capability and supported their overconfident belief that future carrier operations against the US were assured of success.

=== Forces available for Midway ===
One of the most significant effects of the Coral Sea battle was the temporary loss of Shōkaku and Zuikaku to Yamamoto's planned battle against the US carriers at Midway. (Shōhō was to have been employed at Midway in a tactical role supporting the Japanese invasion ground forces.) Although Zuikaku was undamaged, she had lost a large number of aircraft in the battle, and the Japanese apparently did not even consider trying to include Zuikaku in the forthcoming operation. No effort appears to have been made to combine the surviving Shōkaku aircrews with Zuikaku's air groups or to quickly provide Zuikaku with replacement aircraft. Shōkaku herself was unable to conduct further aircraft operations, with her flight deck heavily damaged, and she required almost three months of repair in Japan.

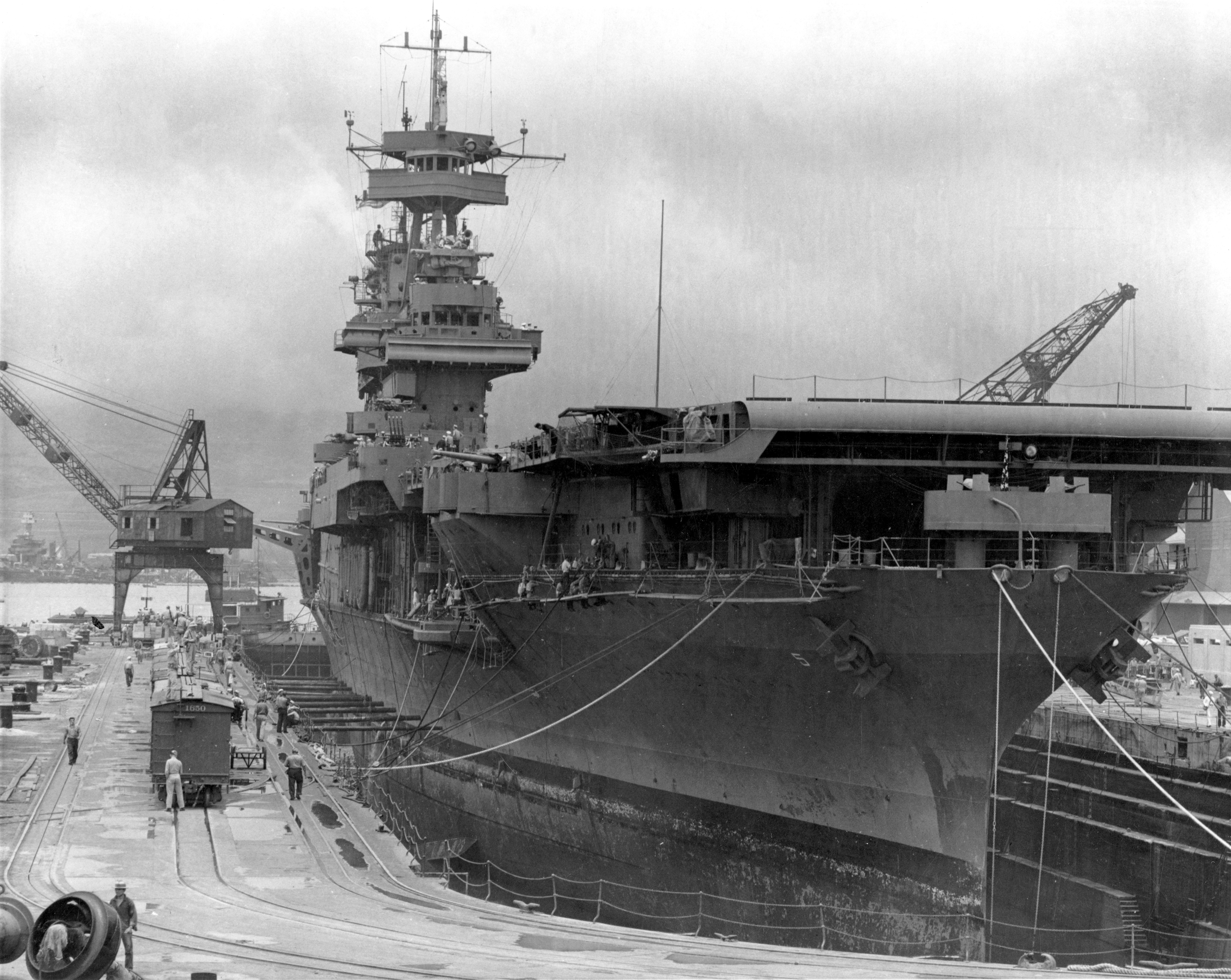
Yorktown in drydock at Pearl Harbor on 29 May 1942, shortly before departing for Midway

The Japanese believed that they sank two carriers in the Coral Sea, but this still left at least two more US Navy carriers, Enterprise and Hornet, to help defend Midway. In fact, Yorktown had only been damaged, but she had also lost a large number of planes in the battle. Unlike the Japanese, the US Navy put forth a maximum effort to make Yorktown available for the coming battle. Although the damage was estimated to take 90 days to repair, Nimitz gave the shipyard only three days, and only the most critical repairs were made to make the ship seaworthy. Yorktown left Pearl Harbor with three of her boilers inoperative and a maximum speed of 27 knots. Unlike the Japanese, the US Navy was willing to put one aircraft carrier's air group on another ship. To make up aircraft losses from the Coral Sea, three of the four Yorktown squadrons were sent ashore and replaced by squadrons from Saratoga, which had been sent to the West Coast for repairs after being torpedoed by a Japanese submarine. Yorktown would go into battle with her own scouting squadron, but Saratoga's torpedo bomber, dive bomber, and fighter squadrons.

The US aircraft carriers had slightly larger aircraft complements than the Japanese carriers, which, when combined with the land-based aircraft at Midway, the availability of Yorktown, and the loss of two Japanese carriers, meant that the Japanese Navy and the US Navy would have near parity in aircraft for the impending battle. At Midway, aircraft flying from Yorktown played crucial roles in the American victory. Yorktown's planes sank the Sōryū, located Hiryū, and helped Enterprise planes sink Hiryū. Yorktown also absorbed both Japanese aerial counterattacks at Midway which otherwise would have been directed at Enterprise and Hornet.

Historians H. P. Willmott, Jonathan Parshall, and Anthony Tully believe Yamamoto made a significant strategic error in his decision to support Operation Mo with strategic assets. Since Yamamoto had decided the decisive battle with the US was to take place at Midway, he should not have diverted any of his important assets, especially fleet carriers, to a secondary operation like Mo. Yamamoto's decision meant Japanese naval forces were weakened just enough at both the Coral Sea and Midway battles to allow the Allies to defeat them in detail. Willmott adds, if either operation was important enough to commit fleet carriers, then all of the Japanese carriers should have been committed to each in order to ensure success. By committing crucial assets to Mo, Yamamoto made the more important Midway operation dependent on the secondary operation's success.

Yamamoto apparently missed two major implications of the Coral Sea battle. The unexpected appearance of US carriers in exactly the right place and time, might have led him to believe the US had cracked IJN codes with cryptanalysis. He also failed to appreciate the US Navy carrier aircrews demonstrating sufficient skill and determination to do significant damage to the Japanese carrier forces. Both would be repeated at Midway, where Japan lost four fleet carriers, the core of her naval offensive forces, and thereby lost the strategic initiative in the Pacific War. Parshall and Tully point out that, due to US industrial strength, once Japan lost its numerical superiority in carrier forces as a result of Midway, Japan could never regain it, adding "The Battle of the Coral Sea had provided the first hints that the Japanese high-water mark had been reached, but it was the Battle of Midway that put up the sign for all to see."

=== Situation in the South Pacific ===
The Australians and US forces in Australia were initially disappointed with the outcome of the Battle of the Coral Sea, fearing the MO operation was the precursor to an invasion of the Australian mainland and the setback to Japan was only temporary. In a meeting held in late May, the Australian Advisory War Council described the battle's result as "rather disappointing" given that the Allies had advance notice of Japanese intentions. General MacArthur provided Australian Prime Minister John Curtin with his assessment of the battle, stating that "all the elements that have produced disaster in the Western Pacific since the beginning of the war" were still present as Japanese forces could strike anywhere if supported by major elements of the IJN.

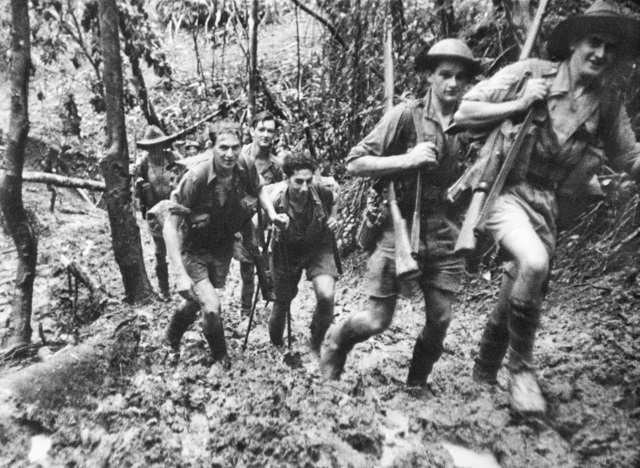
The 39th Australian Infantry Battalion defending the approach to Port Moresby along the Kokoda Track in September 1942. AWM 013288.

Because of the severe losses in carriers at Midway, the Japanese were unable to support another attempt to invade Port Moresby from the sea, forcing Japan to try to take Port Moresby by land. Japan began its land offensive towards Port Moresby along the Kokoda Track on 21 July from Buna and Gona. By then, the Allies had reinforced New Guinea with additional troops (primarily Australian) starting with the Australian 14th Brigade which embarked at Townsville on 15 May. The added forces slowed, then eventually halted the Japanese advance towards Port Moresby in September 1942, and defeated an attempt by the Japanese to overpower an Allied base at Milne Bay.

In the meantime, the Allies learned in July that the Japanese had begun building an airfield on Guadalcanal. Operating from this base the Japanese would threaten the shipping supply routes to Australia. To prevent this from occurring, the US chose Tulagi and nearby Guadalcanal as the target of their first offensive. The failure of the Japanese to take Port Moresby, and their defeat at Midway, had the effect of dangling their base at Tulagi and Guadalcanal without effective protection from other Japanese bases. Tulagi and Guadalcanal were four hours flying time from Rabaul, the nearest large Japanese base.

Three months later, on 7 August 1942, 11,000 United States Marines landed on Guadalcanal, and 3,000 US Marines landed on Tulagi and nearby islands. The Japanese troops on Tulagi and nearby islands were outnumbered and killed almost to the last man in the Battle of Tulagi and Gavutu–Tanambogo and the US Marines on Guadalcanal captured an airfield under construction by the Japanese. Thus began the Guadalcanal and Solomon Islands campaigns that resulted in a series of attritional, combined-arms battles between Allied and Japanese forces over the next year which, in tandem with the New Guinea campaign, eventually neutralized Japanese defenses in the South Pacific, inflicted irreparable losses on the Japanese military—especially its navy—and contributed significantly to the Allies' eventual victory over Japan.

The delay in the advance of Japanese forces also allowed the Marine Corps to land on Funafuti on 2 October 1942, with a Naval Construction Battalion (Seabees) building airfields on three of the atolls of Tuvalu from which USAAF B-24 Liberator bombers of the Seventh Air Force operated. The atolls of Tuvalu acted as a staging post during the preparation for the Battle of Tarawa and the Battle of Makin that commenced on 20 November 1943, which was the implementation of Operation Galvanic.

=== New type of naval warfare ===
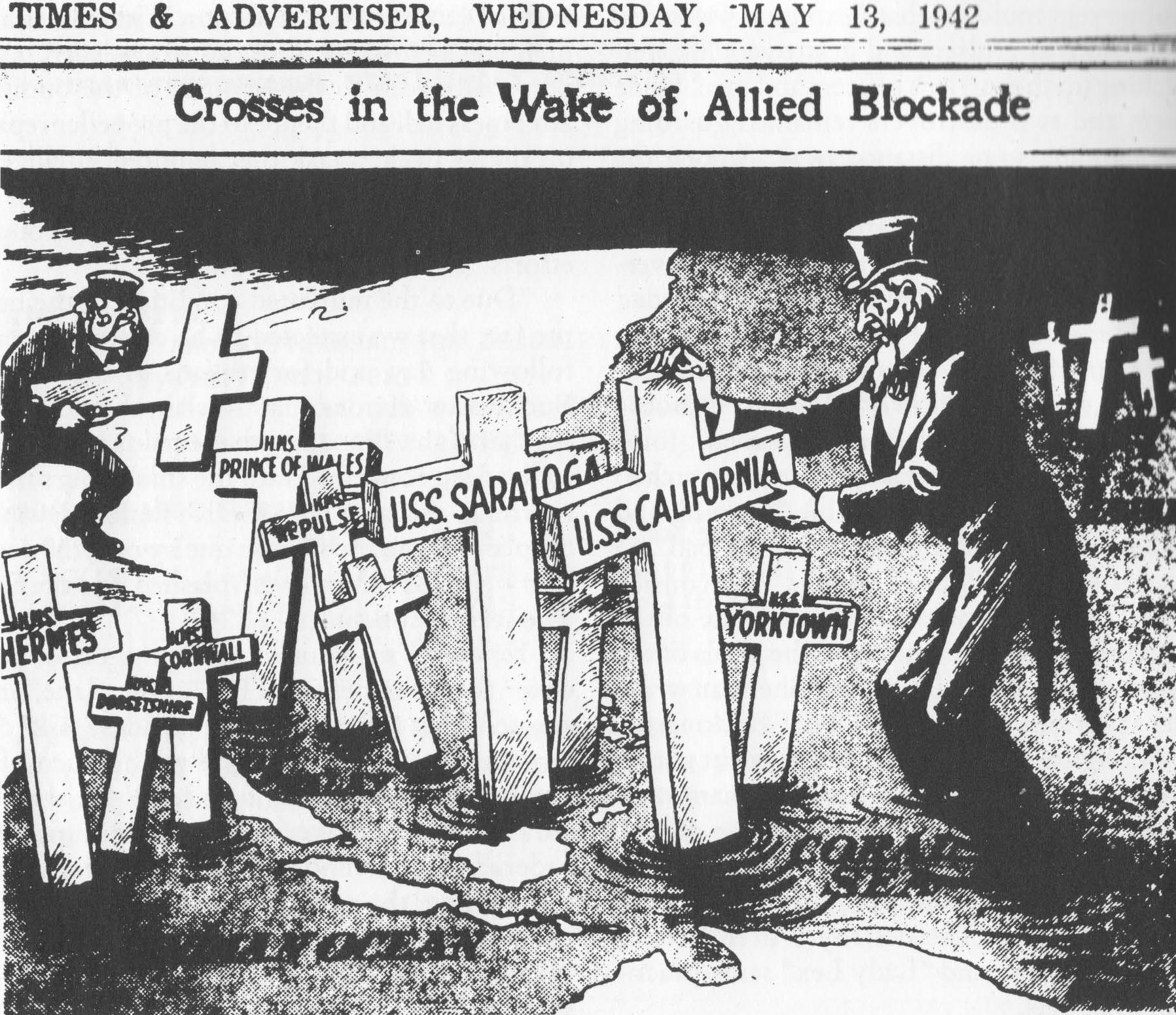
A 13 May 1942 editorial cartoon from the Japanese English-language newspaper Japan Times & Advertiser depicts a dejected Uncle Sam joining John Bull in erecting grave markers for Allied ships which Japan had sunk, or claimed to have sunk, at Coral Sea and elsewhere.

The battle was the first naval engagement in history in which the participating ships never sighted or fired directly at each other. Instead, manned aircraft acted as the offensive artillery for the ships involved. Thus, the respective commanders were participating in a new type of warfare, carrier-versus-carrier, with which neither had any experience. In H. P. Willmot's words, the commanders "had to contend with uncertain and poor communications in situations in which the area of battle had grown far beyond that prescribed by past experience but in which speeds had increased to an even greater extent, thereby compressing decision-making time." Because of the greater speed with which decisions were required, the Japanese were at a disadvantage as Inoue was too far away at Rabaul to effectively direct his naval forces in real time, in contrast to Fletcher who was on-scene with his carriers. The Japanese admirals involved were often slow to communicate important information to one another.

Research has examined how commanders' choices affected the battle's outcome. Two studies used mathematical models to estimate the impact of various alternatives. For example, suppose the US carriers had chosen to sail separately (though still nearby), rather than together. The models indicated the Americans would have suffered slightly less total damage, with one ship sunk but the other unharmed. However, the battle's overall outcome would have been similar. By contrast, suppose one side had located its opponent early enough to launch a first strike, so that only the opponent's survivors could have struck back. The modeling suggested striking first would have provided a decisive advantage, even more beneficial than having an extra carrier.

The experienced Japanese carrier aircrews performed better than those of the US, achieving greater results with an equivalent number of aircraft. The Japanese attack on the US carriers on 8 May was better coordinated than the US attack on the Japanese carriers. The Japanese suffered much higher losses to their carrier aircrews, losing ninety aircrew killed in the battle compared with thirty-five for the US side. Japan's cadre of highly skilled carrier aircrews with which it began the war were, in effect, irreplaceable because of an institutionalized limitation in its training programs and the absence of a pool of experienced reserves or advanced training programs for new airmen. Coral Sea started a trend which resulted in the irreparable attrition of Japan's veteran carrier aircrews by the end of October 1942.

The US did not perform as expected, but it learned from its mistakes in the battle and made improvements to its carrier tactics and equipment, including fighter tactics, strike coordination, torpedo bombers and defensive strategies, such as anti-aircraft artillery, which contributed to better results in later battles. Radar gave the US a limited advantage in this battle, but its value to the US Navy increased over time as the technology improved and the Allies learned how to employ it more effectively. Following the loss of Lexington, improved methods for containing aviation fuel and better damage control procedures were implemented by the US (Note: A Yorktown crewman, Machinist Oscar W. Myers, noted that an aviation gasoline fire on the hangar deck contributed to Lexington's demise. Myers developed a solution, soon implemented in all U.S. carriers, of draining the fuel pipes after use and filling the pipes with carbon dioxide to prevent such fires from taking place again.). Coordination between the Allied land-based air forces and the US Navy was poor during this battle, but this too would improve over time. (Note: According to Gillison, the poor coordination between Fletcher and MacArthur contributed to the friendly fire incident against Crace on 7 May.)

Japanese and US carriers faced off against each other again in the battles of Midway, the Eastern Solomons, and the Santa Cruz Islands in 1942; and the Philippine Sea in 1944. Each of these battles was strategically significant, to varying degrees, in deciding the course and ultimate outcome of the Pacific War. (Note: The U.S. Navy later named a Midway-class aircraft carrier USS Coral Sea after the battle.)

== Films ==
- Battle of the Coral Sea (1959)

== Documentaries ==
- Crusade in the Pacific, Episode 5: The Navy Holds: 1942 (13 min 30 s – 19:37), a segment of an episode from a TV documentary series aired originally in 1951 and made from the theatrical releases of Movietone News in 1942.
- War in the Pacific, Part I: The Pacific in Eruption, an episode from another documentary but made from the same Movietone News newsreels of 1942. Also available in DVD format.
- Battle of the Coral Sea – Lest We Forget, online documentary released in 2010.

== See also ==
- United States Navy in World War II
- Imperial Japanese Navy in World War II
- Pacific Theater aircraft carrier operations during World War II
- World War II carrier-versus-carrier engagements between Allied and Japanese naval forces:
  - Battle of Midway
  - Battle of the Eastern Solomons
  - Battle of the Santa Cruz Islands
  - Battle of the Philippine Sea
  - Battle of Leyte Gulf

== Bibliography ==
=== Print ===
- Armstrong, Michael J. (2014). "The Salvo Combat Model with a Sequential Exchange of Fire". Journal of the Operational Research Society. 65 (10): 1593–1601. doi:10.1057/jors.2013.115. hdl:10464/9357. S2CID 5584333.
- Armstrong, Michael J.; Powell, Michael B. (2005). "A Stochastic Salvo Model Analysis of the Battle of the Coral Sea". Military Operations Research. 10 (4): 27–38. hdl:10464/9377.
- Blair, Clay Jr. (1975). Silent Victory: The U.S. Submarine War Against Japan. New York: Bantam Books. ISBN 0397007531. OCLC 248920140. OL 5042532M.
- Brown, David (1990). Warship Losses of World War Two. Annapolis, Maryland: Naval Institute Press. ISBN 1-55750-914-X.
- Chihaya, Masataka (1991). Goldstein, Donald M.; Dillon, Katherine V. (eds.). Fading Victory: The Diary of Admiral Matome Ugaki, 1941–1945. Gordon W. Prange (foreword) (English trans. ed.). Pittsburgh, Pennsylvania: University of Pittsburgh Press. ISBN 0-8229-3665-8.
- Cressman, Robert (2000). That Gallant Ship U.S.S. Yorktown (CV-5) (4th printing ed.). Missoula, Montana: Pictorial Histories Publishing Company. ISBN 0-933126-57-3.
- D'Albas, Andrieu (1965). Death of a Navy: Japanese Naval Action in World War II. Devin-Adair Pub. ISBN 0-8159-5302-X.
- Dull, Paul S. (1978). A Battle History of the Imperial Japanese Navy, 1941–1945. Naval Institute Press. ISBN 0-87021-097-1.
- Dyer, George C. (1972). "Chapter 16: To the Central Pacific and Tarawa, August 1943—Background to Galvanic". The Amphibians Came to Conquer: The Story of Admiral Richmond Kelly Turner. Washington: US Dept. of the Navy. p. 622. LCCN 71-603853 – via HyperWar Foundation.
- Frame, Tom (1992). Pacific Partners: A History of Australian-American Naval Relations. Sydney: Hodder & Stoughton. ISBN 0-340-56685-X.
- Frank, Richard (1990). Guadalcanal: The Definitive Account of the Landmark Battle. New York: Random House. ISBN 0-394-58875-4.
- Hashimoto, Mochitsura (1954). Sunk: The Story of the Japanese Submarine Fleet 1942–1945. Colegrave, E. H. M. (translator). London: Cassell and Company. OCLC 560995239.
- Hata, Ikuhiko; Izawa, Yasuho (1975). Japanese Naval Aces and Fighter Units in World War II. Don Cyril Gorham (translator) (1989 translated ed.). Annapolis, Maryland: Naval Institute Press. ISBN 0-87021-315-6.
- Hayashi, Saburo (1959). Kogun: The Japanese Army in the Pacific War. Marine Corps Association. ASIN B000ID3YRK.
- Henry, Chris (2003). The Battle of the Coral Sea. Annapolis, Maryland: Naval Institute Press. ISBN 1-59114-033-1.
- Hoehling, A. A. (1971). The Lexington Goes Down. Englewood Cliffs, New Jersey: Prentice-Hall, Inc. ISBN 0-13-535252-5.
- Holmes, W. J. (1979). Double-edged Secrets: U.S. Naval Intelligence Operations in the Pacific During World War II. Annapolis, Maryland: Blue Jacket Books/Naval Institute Press. ISBN 1-55750-324-9.
- Hoyt, Edwin Palmer (2003) [First published 1975]. Blue Skies and Blood: The Battle of the Coral Sea. I Books. ISBN 0-7434-5835-4.
- Hoyt, Edwin Palmer (1986). Japan's War: The Great Pacific Conflict, 1853 to 1952. New York: McGraw-Hill. ISBN 0-07-030612-5. OCLC 185450652. OL 2542515M.
- Ito, Masanori (1956). The End of the Imperial Japanese Navy (1962 translated ed.). Jove Books.
- Jersey, Stanley Coleman (2008). Hell's Islands: The Untold Story of Guadalcanal. College Station, Texas: Texas A&M University Press. ISBN 978-1-58544-616-2.
- Lundstrom, John B. (2006). Black Shoe Carrier Admiral: Frank Jack Fletcher at Coral Sea, Midway, and Guadalcanal. Annapolis, Maryland: Naval Institute Press. ISBN 1-59114-475-2.
- Lundstrom, John B. (2005a). First Team and the Guadalcanal Campaign: Naval Fighter Combat from August to November 1942 (New ed.). Annapolis, Maryland: Naval Institute Press. ISBN 1-59114-472-8.
- Lundstrom, John B. (2005b). The First Team: Pacific Naval Air Combat from Pearl Harbor to Midway (New ed.). Annapolis, Maryland: Naval Institute Press. ISBN 1-59114-471-X.
- McDonald, Neil; Brune, Peter (2005). 200 Shots: Damien Parer and George Silk with the Australians at War in New Guinea. Allen & Unwin Academic. ISBN 1-74114-631-3.
- Millot, Bernard (1974). The Battle of the Coral Sea. S.V. Whitley (Translator). Great Britain: Naval Institute Press. ISBN 0-87021-909-X.
- Morison, Samuel Eliot (2001) [1949]. Coral Sea, Midway and Submarine Actions, May 1942 – August 1942. History of United States Naval Operations in World War II. Vol. IV. Champaign, Illinois: University of Illinois Press. ISBN 0-252-06995-1.
- O'Neill, William L. (1993). A Democracy At War: America's Fight At Home and Abroad in World War II. New York: The Free Press. ISBN 0-02-923678-9. OCLC 489617591. OL 1407286M.
- Parker, Frederick D. (2017) [First published 1993]. "Part One: The Battle of the Coral Sea". A Priceless Advantage: U.S. Navy Communications Intelligence and the Battles of Coral Sea, Midway, and the Aleutians (PDF) (Monograph). Series IV: World War II. Vol. 5 (3rd ed.). Fort George G. Meade, Maryland: Center for Cryptologic History, National Security Agency. OCLC 1124074152. Archived (PDF) from the original on 21 October 2020.
- Parshall, Jonathan; Tully, Anthony (2005). Shattered Sword: The Untold Story of the Battle of Midway. Dulles, Virginia: Potomac Books. ISBN 1-57488-923-0.
- Peattie, Mark R. (1999). Sunburst: The Rise of Japanese Naval Air Power 1909–1941. Annapolis, Maryland: Naval Institute Press. ISBN 1-59114-664-X.
- Prados, John (1995). Combined Fleet Decoded: The Secret History of American Intelligence and the Japanese Navy in World War II. New York: Random House. ISBN 0-679-43701-0.
- Rottman, Gordon L. (2005). Japanese Army in World War II: Conquest of the Pacific 1941–42. Oxford: Osprey. ISBN 1-84176-789-1.
- Salecker, Gene Eric (2001). Fortress Against the Sun: The B-17 Flying Fortress in the Pacific. United States: Da Capo Press. ISBN 1-58097-049-4.
- Spector, Ronald H. (1985). Eagle Against the Sun: The American War with Japan. New York: The Free Press. ISBN 0-02-930360-5.
- Stille, Mark (2007). USN Carriers vs IJN Carriers: The Pacific 1942. New York: Osprey. ISBN 978-1-84603-248-6.
- Tagaya, Osamu (2001). Mitsubishi Type 1 Rikko 'Betty' Units of World War 2. New York: Osprey. ISBN 978-1-84176-082-7.
- Tillman, Barrett (1976). The Dauntless Dive Bomber of World War II. Annapolis, Maryland: Naval Institute Press. ISBN 0-87021-569-8.
- Werneth, Ron (2008). Beyond Pearl Harbor: The Untold Stories of Japan's Naval Airmen. Atglen, Pennsylvania: Schiffer Military History. ISBN 978-0-7643-2932-6.
- Willmott, H. P. (1982). Empires in the Balance: Japanese and Allied Pacific Strategies to April 1942. Annapolis, Maryland: Naval Institute Press. ISBN 0-87021-535-3.
- Willmott, H. P. (1983). The Barrier and the Javelin: Japanese and Allied Pacific Strategies February to June 1942. Annapolis, Maryland: Naval Institute Press. ISBN 0-87021-535-3.
- Willmott, H. P. (2002). The War with Japan: The Period of Balance, May 1942 – October 1943. Wilmington, Delaware: Scholarly Resources Inc. ISBN 0-8420-5032-9.
- Woolridge, E. T., ed. (1993). Carrier Warfare in the Pacific: An Oral History Collection. John B. Connally (Forward). Washington D.C. and London: Smithsonian Institution Press. ISBN 1-56098-264-0.
- The Campaigns of MacArthur in the Pacific (Report). Reports of General MacArthur. Vol. I (Facsimile Reprint ed.). United States Army Center of Military History (USACMH). 1994 [1966]. LCCN 66-60005. Archived from the original on 13 December 2007.
- Japanese Operations in the Southwest Pacific Area (Report). Reports of General MacArthur. Vol. II – Part I (Facsimile Reprint ed.). United States Army Center of Military History (USACMH). 1994 [1966]. LCCN 66-60007. Archived from the original on 8 February 2009.
- "Chapter 4: The Battle of the Coral Sea". United States Strategic Bombing Survey (Pacific) (Report). The Campaigns of the Pacific War. Naval Analysis Division. 1946. Archived from the original on 18 November 2006 – via HyperWar Foundation.

=== Online ===
- Armstrong, Michael J. (2 May 2018). "Alternative Endings to the First Aircraft Carrier Battle". The Conversation.
- Japanese army operations in the South Pacific Area New Britain and Papua campaigns, 1942–43. Senshi Sōshō (translated excerpts). Translated by Bullard, Steven. Canberra: Australian War Memorial. 2007. ISBN 978-0-9751904-8-7. Archived from the original on 9 April 2009.
- Crave, Wesley Frank; Cate, James Lea (1947). Volume I: Plans and Early Operations, January 1939 to August 1942. The Army Air Forces in World War II. Washington DC: [United States] Office of Air Force History. Archived from the original on 21 April 2009 – via HyperWar Foundation.
- Gill, G. Hermon (1968). Volume II – Royal Australian Navy, 1942–1945. Australia in the War of 1939–1945, Series 2: Navy. Canberra: Australian War Memorial.
- Gillison, Douglas (1962). "Chapter 26 – Coral Sea and Midway". Volume I – Royal Australian Air Force, 1939–1942. Australia in the War of 1939–1945, Series 3: Air. Canberra: Australian War Memorial. Archived from the original on 25 May 2009.
- Hackett, Bob; Kingsepp, Sander (2003b). "IJN Submarine I-28: Tabular Record of Movement". Sensuikan!. Combinedfleet.com. Archived from the original on 13 May 2009.
- Hackett, Bob; Kingsepp, Sander (2003c). "IJN Submarine RO-33: Tabular Record of Movement". Sensuikan!. Combinedfleet.com.
- Hackett, Bob; Kingsepp, Sander (2003d). "IJN Submarine RO-34: Tabular Record of Movement". Sensuikan!. Combinedfleet.com.
- Hackett, Bob; Kingsepp, Sander; Alsleben, Allan; Cundall, Peter (2007). "IJN Seaplane Tender Kiyokawa Maru: Tabular Record of Movement". Tokusetsu Suijoki-Bokan!. Combinedfleet.com. Archived from the original on 10 March 2009.
- McCarthy, Dudley (1959). Volume V – South–West Pacific Area – First Year: Kokoda to Wau. Australia in the War of 1939–1945, Series 1: Army. Canberra: Australian War Memorial.
- Nevitt, Allyn (1998). "IJN Kikuzuki: Tabular Record of Movement". Long Lancers. Combinedfleet.com.
- The Battle of the Coral Sea. Combat Narrative (Report). Office of Naval Intelligence, United States Navy. 1943. Archived from the original on 24 December 2006 – via HyperWar Foundation.
- Pelvin, Ric (25 May 2017). "Battle of the Coral Sea, 4–8 May 1942". Australian War Memorial Encyclopedia. Australian War Memorial. Archived from the original on 6 May 2019.
- Phillips, John S. (25 May 1942). USS. Neosho Detail: Engagement of USS. Neosho with Japanese Aircraft on May 7, 1942; Subsequent Loss of USS. Neosho; Search for Survivors (Memorandum). United States Navy. Archived from the original on 4 October 2008 – via HyperWar Foundation. (Primary source)
- Tully, Anthony P. (1999a). "IJN Shoho: Tabular Record of Movement". Kido Butai. Combinedfleet.com.
- Tully, Anthony P. (1999b). "IJN Shokaku: Tabular Record of Movement". Kido Butai. Combinedfleet.com. Archived from the original on 20 February 2009.
- Tully, Anthony P. (1999c). "IJN Zuikaku: Tabular Record of Movement". Kido Butai. Combinedfleet.com. Archived from the original on 21 February 2009.
