= 正德 =

Chinese name
- Chinese: 正德
Transcriptions
Standard Mandarin
- Hanyu Pinyin: Zhèngdé
- Bopomofo: ㄓㄥˋ ㄉㄜˊ

Japanese name
- Kanji: 正徳
- Hiragana: しょうとく
Transcriptions
- Romanization: Shōtoku

正德 (shinjitai: 正徳) may refer to:

- Masanori, Japanese masculine given name
- Zhengde Emperor, 11th Ming dynasty Emperor of China, 1505–1521
- Shōtoku (era), Japanese era name corresponding to April 1711 through June 1716
