= Seiki =

Seiki may refer to:

- Seiki (given name), a Japanese given name
- Seiki Digital, an American television manufacturing company
- Japanese corvette Seiki, a screw sloop in the Imperial Japanese Navy
