= Masanori =

- Gender: Masculine
- Language(s): Japanese

Origin
- Meaning: Depends on kanji

Masanori is a masculine Japanese given name.

== Kanji and meaning ==
The name Masanori is generally written with two kanji, the first read masa and the second read nori, for example:

- Starting with 正 ("correct"):
  - 正規: second kanji 規 means "rule" or "regulation". Also an ordinary word seiki meaning "formal" or "legitimate".
  - 正則: second kanji 則 means "rule" or "regulation". Also an ordinary word seisoku meaning "correct" or proper".
  - 正紀: second kanji 紀 means "historical account". Also used for another masculine given name Seiki.
  - 正徳: second kanji 徳 means "virtue" or "morality". Also a Japanese era name Shōtoku.
  - 正典, 正憲
- Starting with 政 ("to rule"): 政範, 政則, 政矩, 政徳
- Starting with 昌 ("prosperous"): 昌憲, 昌敬, 昌徳, 昌範

== People ==
People with the name Masanori include:

=== Arts and entertainment ===
- Masanori Ashida (芦田 昌憲; born 1945), Japanese photographer
- Masanori Ito (music critic) (伊藤 政則; born 1953), Japanese music critic and radio personality
- Masanori Taki (瀧 正則; born 1967), stage name Pierre Taki, Japanese singer
- Masanori Ishii (石井正則; born 1973), Japanese actor and comedian
- Masanori Tominaga (冨永 昌敬; born 1975), Japanese filmmaker
- Masanori Mark Christianson (born 1976), American guitarist and songwriter
- Masanori Morita (森田 まさのり), Japanese manga artist

=== Government and politics ===
- Akamatsu Masanori (赤松 政範; 1455–1496), general of the Hosokawa clan in the Ōnin War
- Fukushima Masanori (福島 正則; 1561–1624), daimyō of Hiroshima Domain
- Rokugō Masanori (六郷 政乗; 1567–1634), daimyō of Honjō Domain
- Kamei Masanori (亀井 政矩; 1590–1619), daimyō of Tsuwano Domain
- Inaba Masanori (稲葉 正則; 1623–1696), daimyō of Odawara Domain
- Yonekura Masanori (米倉 昌俊; 1784–1812), daimyō of Mutsuura Domain
- Masanori Katsu (勝 正憲; 1879–1957), Japanese bureaucrat and politician
- Masanori Ito (journalist) (伊藤 正徳; 1889–1962), Japanese journalist and military commentator
- Masanori Tanimoto (谷本 正憲; born 1945), governor of Ishikawa prefecture
- Masanori Nishio (西尾 正範; born 1949), mayor of Hakodate

=== Science ===
- Masanori Baba (馬場 昌範), Japanese microbiologist
- Masanori Hata (畑 正憲; born 1935), Japanese zoologist, essayist, and filmmaker
- Masanori Ohya (大矢 雅則; born 1947), Japanese mathematician
- Masanori Hirasawa (平沢 正規), Japanese astronomer
- Masanori Matsuyama (松山 正則), Japanese astronomer

=== Sport ===
- Masanori Yusa (遊佐 正憲; 1915–1975), Japanese swimmer
- Masanori Tokita (鴇田 正憲; 1925–2004), Japanese footballer
- Masanori Aoki (青木 正則; born 1927), Japanese speed skater
- Tensuiyama Masanori (天水山 正則; born 1940), Japanese sumo wrestler
- Masanori Murakami (村上 雅則; born 1944), Japanese baseball player
- Masanori Tsuji (辻 昌憲; 1946–1985), Japanese cyclist
- Masanori Toguchi (戸口 正徳; born 1948), alias of Kim Duk, Zainichi Korean wrestler
- Masanori Sekiya (関谷 正徳; born 1949), Japanese racing car driver
- Tamakiyama Masanori (玉輝山 正則; born 1951), Japanese sumo wrestler
- Masanori Sanada (真田 雅則; 1968–2011), Japanese footballer
- Masanori Sugiura (杉浦 正則; born 1968), Japanese baseball player
- Masanori Suzuki (鈴木 将方; born 1968), Japanese footballer
- Masanori Kizawa (木澤 正徳; born 1969), Japanese footballer
- Masanori Murakawa (村川 政徳; born 1969), stage name The Great Sasuke, Japanese professional wrestler
- Masanori Taguchi (田口 昌徳; born 1970), Japanese baseball catcher
- Hamayoshi Masanori (濱吉 正則; born 1971), Japanese football manager
- Masanori Inoue (井上 将憲; born 1972), Japanese hurdler and bobsledder
- Masanori Suda (須田 匡昇; born 1972), Japanese mixed martial artist
- Masanori Kobayashi (小林 正則; born 1976), Japanese golfer
- Masanori Kawatsu (川津 正徳; born 1978), Japanese fencer
- Masanori Ishikawa (石川 雅規; born 1980), Japanese baseball pitcher
- Masanori Kanehara (金原 正徳; born 1982), Japanese mixed martial artist
- Masanori Hayashi (林 昌範; born 1983), Japanese baseball pitcher
- Masanori Fujihara (藤原 正典; born 1988), Japanese baseball pitcher
- Masanori Abe (阿部 正紀; born 1991), Japanese footballer
