= San Jorge Island =

Island in Solomon Islands

Coordinates: 8°27′S 159°35′E

San Jorge Island is the second largest island in the Isabel Province, Solomon Islands.

== Geography ==
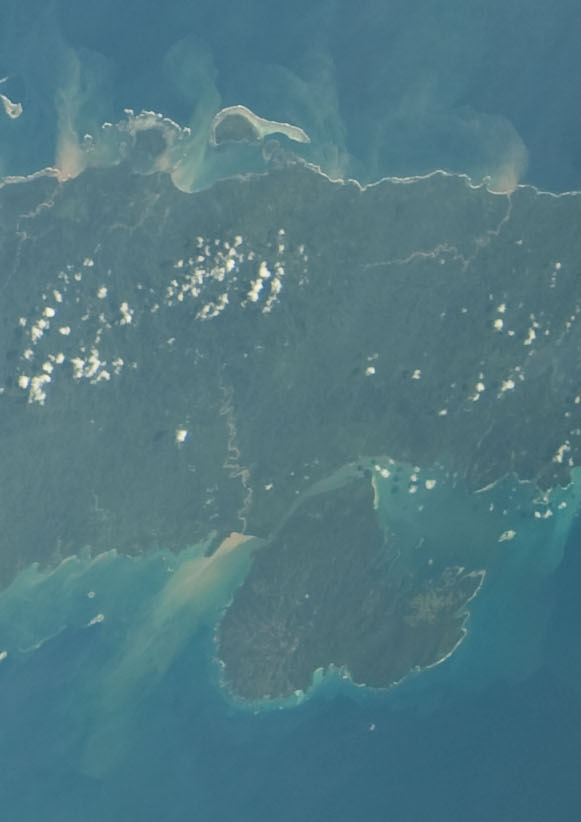
San Jorge Island (from above) in South of the Main Island

The terrain elevation above sea level has been estimated at 159 metres, but SRTM data shows a maximum elevation of about 470 metres. The island lies at the southern end of Santa Isabel Island and borders Thousand Ships Bay. San Jorge has an area of 184 km^{2} (71 sq mi) and has less than 1000 inhabitants living in four villages. The island possesses substantial nickel ore deposites, and international mining companies consider developing mining projects. Also, peridotites associated with pyroxenites, with rare olivine and spinel, are exposed on the island.

== History ==
The first recorded sighting by Europeans was by the Spanish expedition of Álvaro de Mendaña on 21 April 1568. More precisely the sighting was due to a local voyage done by a small boat, in the accounts the brigantine Santiago, commanded by Maestre de Campo Pedro Ortega Valencia and having Hernán Gallego as pilot. They were who charted it with its present-day name, San Jorge, and also who named the narrow channel separating San Jorge from Santa Isabel Island as the Ortega channel after the commander of the expedition.
