= Seiki Shimizu =

Seiki Shimizu (清水 正紀, Shimizu Seiki; born 1915 in Japan) is best known for his work as an author writing about Japanese candlestick charting techniques used to analyze and evaluate stocks in his highly regarded book The Japanese Chart of Charts.

== Business career ==
After graduating from university, Shimizu joined the securities industry before moving to the commodity trading industry to form his own company, Kanetsu Shoji Co., Ltd shortly after World War II.

== Awards ==
He was awarded the Blue Ribbon Medal by the Japanese Emperor Hirohito in 1984 for his contributions to the Japanese commodity futures industry.

== Candlestick technique ==
The candlestick technique is often used by traders and investors who employ Technical Analysis (TA) to guide and manage their stock and/or commodity positions. This technique of graphically representing movements of a stock or commodity's price dates back to the Japanese rice market of the 17th century. At that time, chartists drew their candlesticks on a scroll of Washi paper, from right to left, with a crow quill and India ink ground by hand. These charts provided traders with a sophisticated but quick summary of fluctuations in supply and demand, as well as the emotional and psychological factors at play in the market.
