= Seiki (given name) =

- Gender: Male

Origin
- Origin: Japanese
- Meaning: Different meanings depending on the kanji used

Seiki (written: 正紀, 正義, 世起, 靖己, 清喜, 清輝 or 聖曠) is a masculine Japanese given name. Notable people with the name include:

- Seiki Ichihara (市原 聖曠), Japanese football and manager
- Seiki Kayamori (1877–1941), Japanese photographer
- Kuroda Seiki (黒田 清輝; 1866–1924), pseudonym of Kuroda Kiyoteru, Japanese painter and teacher
- Seiki Nose (野瀬 清喜; born 1952), Japanese judoka
- Seiki Okuda (奥田 靖己; born 1960), Japanese golfer
- Seiki Segawa (瀬川 正義; born 1961), Japanese boxer
- Seiki Shimizu (清水 正紀), Japanese writer
- Seiki Yoshioka (吉岡 世起; born 1988), Japanese professional wrestler
