= Thousand Ships Bay =

Bay in Santa Isabel, Solomon Islands

Coordinates: 8°25′S 159°40′E

Thousand Ships Bay is a bay located on the south coast of Santa Isabel Island in the Solomon Islands, between San Jorge Island and Santa Isabel Island.
