= Masanori Itō (journalist) =

Masanori Itō (伊藤正徳, Itō Masanori; 18 October 1889 – 21 April 1962) was a Japanese journalist, author, and one of Japan's leading military commentators. He personally knew many of the Japanese naval commanders of the Second World War. He was the author of the book The End of the Imperial Japanese Navy (連合艦隊の最後: 太平洋海戦史), first printed in 1956, which was a dramatic account offering a rare glimpse into Japanese naval warfare in the Pacific, from the attack on Pearl Harbor to the final bloody sorties as American forces closed in on Japan.

== Bibliography ==
- Itō (伊藤), Masanori (正徳) (1962) [1956]. The End of the Imperial Japanese Navy. translation. Jove Books. ISBN 0-515-08682-7.
