= List of things named after Adrien-Marie Legendre =

Adrien-Marie Legendre (1752–1833) is the eponym of all of the things listed below.

- 26950 Legendre
- Associated Legendre polynomials
- Fourier–Legendre series
- Gauss–Legendre algorithm
- Gauss–Legendre method
- Gauss–Legendre quadrature
- Legendre (crater)
- Legendre chi function
- Legendre duplication formula
- Legendre–Papoulis filter
- Legendre form
- Legendre function
- Legendre moment
- Legendre polynomials
- Legendre pseudospectral method
- Legendre rational functions
- Legendre relation
- Legendre sieve
- Legendre symbol
- Legendre transformation
  - Legendre transform (integral transform)
  - Finite Legendre transform
- Legendre wavelet
- Legendre–Clebsch condition
- Legendre–Fenchel transformation
- Legendre's conjecture
- Legendre's constant
- Legendre's differential equation
- Legendre's equation
- Legendre's formula
- Legendrian knot
- Legendrian submanifold
- Saccheri–Legendre theorem
- Legendre's theorem on spherical triangles
- Legendre's three-square theorem
- Gamma function–Legendre formula
