= Legendre =

Legendre, LeGendre or Le Gendre is a French surname. It may refer to:

- Adrien-Marie Legendre (1752–1833), French mathematician
  - Associated Legendre polynomials
  - Legendre's equation
  - Legendre polynomials
  - Legendre symbol
  - Legendre transformation
  - Legendre (crater), a lunar impact crater
  - 26950 Legendre, a main-belt asteroid discovered in 1997
- Anne Legendre Armstrong (1927–2008), American diplomat and politician
- Charles Le Gendre (1830–1899), French-born American general and diplomat
- Elías Legendre (born 2008), Ecuadorian footballer
- Esther Le Gendre, Trinidad and Tobago politician
- François Legendre (1763–1853), surveyor, seigneur and politician in Lower Canada
- Géraldine Legendre (born 1953), French-American cognitive scientist and linguist
- Gertrude Sanford Legendre (1902–2000), American socialite and World War II spy
- Jacques Legendre (disambiguation), several people
- Kevin Le Gendre, British journalist and broadcaster
- Louis Legendre (1752–1797), French politician of the Revolution period
- Louis Legendre (oceanographer), Canadian oceanographer
- Pierre Legendre (historian) (born 1930), French historian of law and psychoanalyst
- Pierre Legendre (ecologist), Canadian numerical ecologist
- Richard Legendre (born 1953), Canadian tennis player and politician from Quebec
- Robert LeGendre (1898–1931), American athlete
