= Nome (mathematics) =

Special mathematical function

In mathematics, specifically the theory of elliptic functions, the nome is a special function that belongs to the non-elementary functions. This function is of great importance in the description of the elliptic functions, especially in the description of the modular identity of the Jacobi theta function, the Hermite elliptic transcendents and the Weber modular functions, that are used for solving equations of higher degrees.

== Definition ==
The nome function is given by

$$q
=\mathrm{e}^{-{\pi K'/K}}
=\mathrm{e}^{{i} \pi\omega_2/\omega_1}
=\mathrm{e}^{{i} \pi \tau}
\,$$

where $K$ and $iK'$ are the quarter periods, and $2 \omega_1$ and $2 \omega_2$ are the fundamental pair of periods, and $\tau=\frac{iK'}{K}=\frac{\omega_2}{\omega_1}$ is the half-period ratio. The nome can be taken to be a function of any one of these quantities; conversely, any one of these quantities can be taken as functions of the nome. Each of them uniquely determines the others when $0<q<1$. That is, when $0<q<1$, the mappings between these various symbols are both $1$-to-$1$ and onto, and so can be inverted: the quarter periods, the half-periods and the half-period ratio can be explicitly written as functions of the nome. For general $q\in\mathbb{C}$ with $0<|q|<1$, $\tau$ is not a single-valued function of $q$. Explicit expressions for the quarter periods, in terms of the nome, are given in the linked article.

Notationally, the quarter periods $K$ and $iK'$ are usually used only in the context of the Jacobian elliptic functions, whereas the half-periods $\omega_1$ and $\omega_2$ are usually used only in the context of Weierstrass elliptic functions. Some authors, notably Apostol, use $\omega_1$ and $\omega_2$ to denote whole periods rather than half-periods.

The nome is frequently used as a value with which elliptic functions and modular forms can be described; on the other hand, it can also be thought of as function, because the quarter periods are functions of the elliptic modulus $k$: $q(k) = \mathrm{e}^{-\pi K'(k)/K(k)}$.

The complementary nome $q_1$ is given by

$$q_1(k) = \mathrm{e}^{-\pi K(k)/K'(k)}. \,$$

Sometimes the notation $q=\mathrm{e}^{{2\rm{i}} \pi \tau}$ is used for the square of the nome.

The mentioned functions $K$ and $K'$ are called complete elliptic integrals of the first kind. They are defined as follows:

$$K(x) = \int_0^{\pi/2} \frac{1}{\sqrt{1 - x^2\sin(\varphi)^2}} \,\mathrm{d}\varphi = \int_0^1 \frac{2}{\sqrt{(y^2+1)^2 - 4x^2y^2}} \mathrm{d}y$$

$$K'(x) = K(\sqrt{1 - x^2}) = \int_0^{\pi/2} \frac{1}{\sqrt{1 - (1 - x^2)\sin(\varphi)^2}} \,\mathrm{d}\varphi$$

== Applications ==
The nome solves the following equation:

$$|k| = \frac{\vartheta_{10}^2[0,q(k)]}{\vartheta_{00}^2[0,q(k)]}\rightarrow q(k) = \mathrm{e}^{-\pi K'(k)/K(k)}$$

This analogon is valid for the Pythagorean complementary modulus:

$$k' = \sqrt{1 - k^2} = \frac{\vartheta_{01}^2[0,q(k)]}{\vartheta_{00}^2[0,q(k)]}\rightarrow q(k) = \mathrm{e}^{-\pi K'(k)/K(k)}$$

where $\vartheta_{10},\theta_{00}$ are the complete Jacobi theta functions and $K(k)$ is the complete elliptic integral of the first kind with modulus $k$ shown in the formula above. For the complete theta functions these definitions introduced by Sir Edmund Taylor Whittaker and George Neville Watson are valid:

$$\vartheta_{00}(v;w) = \prod_{n = 1}^\infty (1-w^{2n})[1+2\cos(2v)w^{2n-1}+w^{4n-2}]$$
$$\vartheta_{01}(v;w) = \prod_{n = 1}^\infty (1-w^{2n})[1-2\cos(2v)w^{2n-1}+w^{4n-2}]$$
$$\vartheta_{10}(v;w) = 2 w^{1/4}\cos(v)\prod_{n = 1}^\infty (1-w^{2n})[1+2\cos(2v)w^{2n}+w^{4n}]$$

These three definition formulas are written down in the fourth edition of the book A Course in Modern Analysis written by Whittaker and Watson on the pages 469 and 470. The nome is commonly used as the starting point for the construction of Lambert series, the q-series and more generally the q-analogs. That is, the half-period ratio $\tau$ is commonly used as a coordinate on the complex upper half-plane, typically endowed with the Poincaré metric to obtain the Poincaré half-plane model. The nome then serves as a coordinate on a punctured disk of unit radius; it is punctured because $q=0$ is not part of the disk (or rather, $q=0$ corresponds to $\tau \to \infty$). This endows the punctured disk with the Poincaré metric.

The upper half-plane (and the Poincaré disk, and the punctured disk) can thus be tiled with the fundamental domain, which is the region of values of the half-period ratio $\tau$ (or of $q$, or of $K$ and $iK'$ etc.) that uniquely determine a tiling of the plane by parallelograms. The tiling is referred to as the modular symmetry given by the modular group. Some functions that are periodic on the upper half-plane are called to as modular functions; the nome, the half-periods, the quarter-periods or the half-period ratio all provide different parameterizations for these periodic functions.

The prototypical modular function is Klein's j-invariant. It can be written as a function of either the half-period ratio τ or as a function of the nome $q$. The series expansion in terms of the nome or the square of the nome (the q-expansion) is famously connected to the Fisher-Griess monster by means of monstrous moonshine.

Euler's function arises as the prototype for q-series in general.

The nome, as the $q$ of q-series then arises in the theory of affine Lie algebras, essentially because (to put it poetically, but not factually) those algebras describe the symmetries and isometries of Riemann surfaces.

== Curve sketching ==
Every real value $x$ of the interval $[-1,1]$ is assigned to a real number between inclusive zero and inclusive one in the nome function $q(x)$. The elliptic nome function is axial symmetric to the ordinate axis. Thus: $q(x) = q(-x)$. The functional curve of the nome passes through the origin of coordinates with the slope zero and curvature plus one eighth. For the real valued interval $(-1,1)$ the nome function $q(x)$ is strictly left-curved.

== Derivatives ==
The Legendre's relation is defined that way:

$$K\,E' + E\,K' - K\,K' = \tfrac{1}{2}\pi$$

And as described above, the elliptic nome function $q(x)$ has this original definition:

$$q(x) = \exp\left[-\pi \,\frac{K(\sqrt{1 - x^2})}{K(x)}\right]$$

Furthermore, these are the derivatives of the two complete elliptic integrals:

$$\frac{\mathrm{d}}{\mathrm{d}x} K(x) = \frac{1}{x(1 - x^2)}\bigl[E(x) - (1 - x^2)K(x)\bigr]$$
$$\frac{\mathrm{d}}{\mathrm{d}x} E(x) = -\frac{1}{x}\bigl[K(x) - E(x)\bigr]$$

Therefore, the derivative of the nome function has the following expression:

$$\frac{\mathrm{d}}{\mathrm{d}x} \,q(x) = \frac{\pi^2}{2x(1-x^2)K(x)^2} \,q(x)$$

The second derivative can be expressed this way:

$$\frac{\mathrm{d}^2}{\mathrm{d}x^2} \,q(x) = \frac{\pi^4 + 2\pi^2 (1+x^2)K(x)^2 - 4\pi^2 K(x)E(x)}{4x^2(1-x^2)^2 K(x)^4} \,q(x)$$

And that is the third derivative:

$$\frac{\mathrm{d}^3}{\mathrm{d}x^3} \,q(x) = \frac{\pi^6 + 6\pi^4 (1+x^2)K(x)^2 - 12\pi^4 K(x)E(x) + 8\pi^2 (1+x^2)^2 K(x)^4 - 24\pi^2 (1+x^2)K(x)^3 E(x) + 24\pi^2 K(x)^2 E(x)^2}{8x^3(1-x^2)^3 K(x)^6} \,q(x)$$

The complete elliptic integral of the second kind is defined as follows:

$$E(x) = \int_0^{\pi/2} \sqrt{1-x^2\sin(\varphi)^2} \,\mathrm{d}\varphi = 2\int_0^1 \frac{\sqrt{(y^2+1)^2 - 4x^2y^2}}{(y^2+1)^2} \,\mathrm{d}y$$

The following equation follows from these equations by eliminating the complete elliptic integral of the second kind:

$$3\biggl[\frac{\mathrm{d}^2}{\mathrm{d}x^2} q(x)\biggr]^2 - 2\biggl[\frac{\mathrm{d}}{\mathrm{d}x} q(x)\biggr]\biggl[\frac{\mathrm{d}^3}{\mathrm{d}x^3} q(x)\biggr] = \frac{\pi^8 - 4\pi^4 (1+x^2)^2 K(x)^4}{16x^4(1-x^2)^4 K(x)^8} q(x)^2$$

Thus, the following third-order quartic differential equation is valid:

$$x^2 (1-x^2)^2 [2q(x)^2 q'(x)q'''(x) - 3q(x)^2 q''(x)^2 + q'(x)^4] = (1+x^2)^2 q(x)^2 q'(x)^2$$

== MacLaurin series and integer sequences ==
=== Kneser sequence ===
Given is the derivative of the Elliptic Nome mentioned above:

$$\frac{\mathrm{d}}{\mathrm{d}x} \,q(x) = \frac{\pi^2}{2x(1-x^2)K(x)^2} \,q(x)$$

The outer factor with the K-integral in the denominator shown in this equation is the derivative of the elliptic period ratio. The elliptic period ratio is the quotient of the K-integral of the Pythagorean complementary modulus divided by the K-integral of the modulus itself. And the integer number sequence in MacLaurin series of that elliptic period ratio leads to the integer sequence of the series of the elliptic nome directly.

The German mathematician Adolf Kneser researched on the integer sequence of the elliptic period ratio in his essay Neue Untersuchung einer Reihe aus der Theorie der elliptischen Funktionen and showed that the generating function of this sequence is an elliptic function. Also a further mathematician with the name Robert Fricke analyzed this integer sequence in his essay Die elliptischen Funktionen und ihre Anwendungen and described the accurate computing methods by using this mentioned sequence. The Kneser integer sequence Kn(n) can be constructed in this way:

$\text{Kn}(2n) = 2^{4n-3} \binom{4n}{2n} + \sum_{m = 1}^{n} 4^{2n-2m} \binom{4n}{2n-2m} \text{Kn}(m)$

$\text{Kn}(2n+1) = 2^{4n-1} \binom{4n+2}{2n+1} + \sum_{m = 1}^{n} 4^{2n-2m+1} \binom{4n+2}{2n-2m+1} \text{Kn}(m)$

Executed examples:

$\text{Kn}(2) = 2 \times 6 + 1 \times {\color{cornflowerblue}1} = {\color{cornflowerblue}13}$

$\text{Kn}(3) = 8 \times 20 + 24 \times {\color{cornflowerblue}1} = {\color{cornflowerblue}184}$

$\text{Kn}(4) = 32 \times 70 + 448 \times {\color{cornflowerblue}1} + 1 \times {\color{cornflowerblue}13} = {\color{cornflowerblue}2701}$

$\text{Kn}(5) = 128 \times 252 + 7680 \times {\color{cornflowerblue}1} + 40 \times {\color{cornflowerblue}13} = {\color{cornflowerblue}40456}$

$\text{Kn}(6) = 512 \times 924 + 126720 \times {\color{cornflowerblue}1} + 1056 \times {\color{cornflowerblue}13} + 1 \times {\color{cornflowerblue}184} = {\color{cornflowerblue}613720}$

$\text{Kn}(7) = 2048 \times 3432 + 2050048 \times {\color{cornflowerblue}1} + 23296 \times {\color{cornflowerblue}13} + 56 \times {\color{cornflowerblue}184} = {\color{cornflowerblue}9391936}$

The Kneser sequence appears in the Taylor series of the period ratio (half period ratio):

$$\frac{1}{4}\ln\bigl(\frac{16}{x^2}\bigr) - \frac{\pi \,K'(x)}{4 \,K(x)} = \sum_{n = 1}^{\infty} \frac{\text{Kn}(n)}{2^{4n - 1}n}\,x^{2n}$$

$${\color{limegreen}\frac{1}{4}\ln\bigl(\frac{16}{x^2}\bigr) - \frac{\pi \,K'(x)}{4 \,K(x)} = \frac{{\color{cornflowerblue}1}}{8}x^2 + \frac{{\color{cornflowerblue}13}}{256}x^4 + \frac{{\color{cornflowerblue}184}}{6144}x^6 + \frac{{\color{cornflowerblue}2701}}{131072}x^8 + \frac{{\color{cornflowerblue}40456}}{2621440}x^{10} + \ldots}$$

The derivative of this equation after $x$ leads to this equation that shows the generating function of the Kneser number sequence:

$$\frac{\pi^2}{8x(1 - x^2)K(x)^2} - \frac{1}{2x} = \sum_{n = 1}^{\infty} \frac{\text{Kn}(n)}{2^{4n - 2}}x^{2n - 1}$$

$${\color{limegreen}\frac{\pi^2}{8x(1 - x^2)K(x)^2} - \frac{1}{2x} = \frac{{\color{cornflowerblue}1}}{4}x + \frac{{\color{cornflowerblue}13}}{64}x^3 + \frac{{\color{cornflowerblue}184}}{1024}x^5 + \frac{{\color{cornflowerblue}2701}}{16384}x^7 + \frac{{\color{cornflowerblue}40456}}{262144}x^9 + \ldots}$$

This result appears because of the Legendre's relation $K\,E' + E\,K' - K\,K' = \tfrac{1}{2}\pi$ in the numerator.

=== Schellbach Schwarz sequence ===
The mathematician Karl Heinrich Schellbach discovered the integer number sequence that appears in the MacLaurin series of the fourth root of the quotient Elliptic Nome function divided by the square function. The construction of this sequence is detailed in his work Die Lehre von den Elliptischen Integralen und den Thetafunktionen. The sequence was also constructed by the Silesian German mathematician Hermann Amandus Schwarz in Formeln und Lehrsätze zum Gebrauche der elliptischen Funktionen (pages 54–56, chapter Berechnung der Grösse k). This Schellbach Schwarz number sequence Sc(n) was also analyzed by the mathematicians Karl Theodor Wilhelm Weierstrass and Louis Melville Milne-Thomson in the 20th century. The mathematician Adolf Kneser determined a construction for this sequence based on the following pattern:

$$\text{Sc}(n+1) = \frac{2}{n}\sum _{m = 1}^{n} \text{Sc}(m)\,\text{Kn}(n + 1 - m)$$

The Schellbach Schwarz sequence Sc(n) appears in the On-Line Encyclopedia of Integer Sequences under the number A002103 and the Kneser sequence Kn(n) appears under the number A227503.

The following table contains the Kneser numbers and the Schellbach Schwarz numbers:

Constructed sequences Kneser and Schellbach Schwarz
Index n	Kn(n) (A227503)	Sc(n) (A002103)
1	1	1
2	13	2
3	184	15
4	2701	150
5	40456	1707
6	613720	20910
7	9391936	268616
8	144644749	3567400

And this sequence creates the MacLaurin series of the elliptic nome in exactly this way:

$$q(x) = \sum_{n = 1}^{\infty} \frac{\text{Sc}(n)}{2^{4n - 3}} \biggl(\frac{1 - \sqrt[4]{1 - x^2}}{1 + \sqrt[4]{1 - x^2}}\biggr)^{4n - 3} = x^2\biggl\{\frac{1}{2} + \biggl[\sum_{n = 1}^{\infty} \frac{\text{Sc}(n + 1)}{2^{4n + 1}} x^{2n}\biggr]\biggr\}^4$$

$$q(x) = x^2\bigl({\color{limegreen}\frac{{\color{navy}1}}{2} + \frac{{\color{navy}2}}{32}x^2 + \frac{{\color{navy}15}}{512}x^4 + \frac{{\color{navy}150}}{8192}x^6 + \frac{{\color{navy}1707}}{131072}x^8 + \ldots}\bigr)^4$$

In the following, it will be shown as an example how the Schellbach Schwarz numbers are built up successively. For this, the examples with the numbers Sc(4) = 150, Sc(5) = 1707 and Sc(6) = 20910 are used:

$$\mathrm{Sc}(4) = \frac{2}{3}\sum _{m = 1}^{3} \mathrm{Sc}(m) \,\mathrm{Kn}(4 - m) = \frac{2}{3} \bigl[{\color{navy}\mathrm{Sc}(1)}\,{\color{cornflowerblue}\mathrm{Kn}(3)} + {\color{navy}\mathrm{Sc}(2)}\,{\color{cornflowerblue}\mathrm{Kn}(2)} + {\color{navy}\mathrm{Sc}(3)}\,{\color{cornflowerblue}\mathrm{Kn}(1)} \bigr]$$

$${\color{navy}\mathrm{Sc}(4)} = \frac{2}{3} \bigl({\color{navy}1} \times {\color{cornflowerblue}184} + {\color{navy}2} \times {\color{cornflowerblue}13} + {\color{navy}15} \times {\color{cornflowerblue}1} \bigr) = {\color{navy}150}$$

$$\mathrm{Sc}(5) = \frac{2}{4}\sum _{m = 1}^{4} \mathrm{Sc}(m) \,\mathrm{Kn}(5 - m) = \frac{2}{4} \bigl[{\color{navy}\mathrm{Sc}(1)}\,{\color{cornflowerblue}\mathrm{Kn}(4)} + {\color{navy}\mathrm{Sc}(2)}\,{\color{cornflowerblue}\mathrm{Kn}(3)} + {\color{navy}\mathrm{Sc}(3)}\,{\color{cornflowerblue}\mathrm{Kn}(2)} + {\color{navy}\mathrm{Sc}(4)}\,{\color{cornflowerblue}\mathrm{Kn}(1)} \bigr]$$

$${\color{navy}\mathrm{Sc}(5)} = \frac{2}{4} \bigl({\color{navy}1} \times {\color{cornflowerblue}2701} + {\color{navy}2} \times {\color{cornflowerblue}184} + {\color{navy}15} \times {\color{cornflowerblue}13} + {\color{navy}150} \times {\color{cornflowerblue}1} \bigr) = {\color{navy}1707}$$

$$\mathrm{Sc}(6) = \frac{2}{5}\sum _{m = 1}^{5} \mathrm{Sc}(m) \,\mathrm{Kn}(6 - m) = \frac{2}{5} \bigl[{\color{navy}\mathrm{Sc}(1)}\,{\color{cornflowerblue}\mathrm{Kn}(5)} + {\color{navy}\mathrm{Sc}(2)}\,{\color{cornflowerblue}\mathrm{Kn}(4)} + {\color{navy}\mathrm{Sc}(3)}\,{\color{cornflowerblue}\mathrm{Kn}(3)} + {\color{navy}\mathrm{Sc}(4)}\,{\color{cornflowerblue}\mathrm{Kn}(2)} + {\color{navy}\mathrm{Sc}(5)}\, {\color{cornflowerblue}\mathrm{Kn}(1)} \bigr]$$

$${\color{navy}\mathrm{Sc}(6)} = \frac{2}{5} \bigl({\color{navy}1} \times {\color{cornflowerblue}40456} + {\color{navy}2} \times {\color{cornflowerblue}2701} + {\color{navy}15} \times {\color{cornflowerblue}184} + {\color{navy}150} \times {\color{cornflowerblue}13} + {\color{navy}1707} \times {\color{cornflowerblue}1} \bigr) = {\color{navy}20910}$$

=== Kotěšovec sequence ===
The MacLaurin series of the nome function q(x) has even exponents and positive coefficients at all positions:

$$q(x) = \sum_{n = 1}^{\infty} \frac{\operatorname{Kt}(n)}{16^n}\,x^{2n}$$

And the sum with the same absolute values of the coefficients but with alternating signs generates this function:

$$q\bigl[x(x^2+1)^{-1/2}\bigr] = \sum_{n = 1}^{\infty} \frac{(-1)^{n+1}\operatorname{Kt}(n)}{16^n}\,x^{2n}$$

The radius of convergence of this Maclaurin series is 1. Here $\operatorname{Kt}(n)$ (OEIS A005797) is a sequence of exclusively natural numbers $\operatorname{Kt}(n) \isin \mathbb{N}$ for all natural numbers $n \isin \mathbb{N}$ and this integer number sequence is not elementary. This sequence of numbers $\operatorname{Kt}(n)$ was researched by Czech mathematician and fairy chess composer Václav Kotěšovec, born 1956. Two ways of constructing this integer sequence shall be shown in the next section.

=== Construction method with Kneser numbers ===
The Kotěšovec numbers are generated in the same way as the Schellbach Schwarz numbers are constructed:

The only difference consists in the fact that this time the factor before the sum in this corresponding analogous formula is not $\frac{2}{n}$ anymore, but $\frac{8}{n}$ instead of that:

$$\text{Kt}(n+1) = \frac{8}{n}\sum _{m = 1}^{n} \text{Kt}(m)\,\text{Kn}(n + 1 - m)$$

Following table contains the Schellbach Schwarz numbers and the Kneser numbers and the Apéry numbers:

Constructed sequences Kneser and Kotěšovec
Index n	Kn(n) (A227503)	Kt(n) (A005797)
1	1	1
2	13	8
3	184	84
4	2701	992
5	40456	12514
6	613720	164688
7	9391936	2232200
8	144644749	30920128

In the following, it will be shown as an example how the Schellbach Schwarz numbers are built up successively. For this, the examples with the numbers Kt(4) = 992, Kt(5) = 12514 and Kt(6) = 164688 are used:

$$\mathrm{Kt}(4) = \frac{8}{3}\sum _{m = 1}^{3} \mathrm{Kt}(m) \,\mathrm{Kn}(4 - m) = \frac{8}{3} \bigl[{\color{ForestGreen}\mathrm{Kt}(1)}\,{\color{cornflowerblue}\mathrm{Kn}(3)} + {\color{ForestGreen}\mathrm{Kt}(2)}\,{\color{cornflowerblue}\mathrm{Kn}(2)} + {\color{ForestGreen}\mathrm{Kt}(3)}\,{\color{cornflowerblue}\mathrm{Kn}(1)} \bigr]$$

$${\color{ForestGreen}\mathrm{Kt}(4)} = \frac{8}{3} \bigl({\color{ForestGreen}1} \times {\color{cornflowerblue}184} + {\color{ForestGreen}8} \times {\color{cornflowerblue}13} + {\color{ForestGreen}84} \times {\color{cornflowerblue}1} \bigr) = {\color{ForestGreen}992}$$

$$\mathrm{Kt}(5) = \frac{8}{4}\sum _{m = 1}^{4} \mathrm{Kt}(m) \,\mathrm{Kn}(5 - m) = \frac{8}{4} \bigl[{\color{ForestGreen}\mathrm{Kt}(1)}\,{\color{cornflowerblue}\mathrm{Kn}(4)} + {\color{ForestGreen}\mathrm{Kt}(2)}\,{\color{cornflowerblue}\mathrm{Kn}(3)} + {\color{ForestGreen}\mathrm{Kt}(3)}\,{\color{cornflowerblue}\mathrm{Kn}(2)} + {\color{ForestGreen}\mathrm{Kt}(4)}\,{\color{cornflowerblue}\mathrm{Kn}(1)} \bigr]$$

$${\color{ForestGreen}\mathrm{Kt}(5)} = \frac{8}{4} \bigl({\color{ForestGreen}1} \times {\color{cornflowerblue}2701} + {\color{ForestGreen}8} \times {\color{cornflowerblue}184} + {\color{ForestGreen}84} \times {\color{cornflowerblue}13} + {\color{ForestGreen}992} \times {\color{cornflowerblue}1} \bigr) = {\color{ForestGreen}12514}$$

$$\mathrm{Kt}(6) = \frac{8}{5}\sum _{m = 1}^{5} \mathrm{Kt}(m) \,\mathrm{Kn}(6 - m) = \frac{8}{5} \bigl[{\color{ForestGreen}\mathrm{Kt}(1)}\,{\color{cornflowerblue}\mathrm{Kn}(5)} + {\color{ForestGreen}\mathrm{Kt}(2)}\,{\color{cornflowerblue}\mathrm{Kn}(4)} + {\color{ForestGreen}\mathrm{Kt}(3)}\,{\color{cornflowerblue}\mathrm{Kn}(3)} + {\color{ForestGreen}\mathrm{Kt}(4)}\,{\color{cornflowerblue}\mathrm{Kn}(2)} + {\color{ForestGreen}\mathrm{Kt}(5)}\, {\color{cornflowerblue}\mathrm{Kn}(1)} \bigr]$$

$${\color{ForestGreen}\mathrm{Kt}(6)} = \frac{8}{5} \bigl({\color{ForestGreen}1} \times {\color{cornflowerblue}40456} + {\color{ForestGreen}8} \times {\color{cornflowerblue}2701} + {\color{ForestGreen}84} \times {\color{cornflowerblue}184} + {\color{ForestGreen}992} \times {\color{cornflowerblue}13} + {\color{ForestGreen}12514} \times {\color{cornflowerblue}1} \bigr) = {\color{ForestGreen}164688}$$

So the MacLaurin series of the direct Elliptic Nome can be generated:

$$q(x) = \sum_{n = 1}^{\infty} \frac{\text{Kt}(n)}{16^{n}} \,x^{2n}$$

$$q(x) = {\color{limegreen}\frac{{\color{ForestGreen}1}}{16}x^2 + \frac{{\color{ForestGreen}8}}{256}x^4 + \frac{{\color{ForestGreen}84}}{4096}x^6 + \frac{{\color{ForestGreen}992}}{65536}x^8 + \frac{{\color{ForestGreen}12514}}{1048576}x^{10} + \ldots}$$

=== Construction method with Apéry numbers ===
By adding a further integer number sequence $\operatorname{Ap}(n)$ that denotes a specially modified Apéry sequence (OEIS A036917), the sequence of the Kotěšovec numbers $\operatorname{Kt}(n)$ can be generated. The starting value of the sequence $\operatorname{Kt}(n)$ is the value $\operatorname{Kt}(1)=1$ and the following values of this sequence are generated with those two formulas that are valid for all numbers $n \isin \mathbb{N}$:

$$\operatorname{Kt}(n+1) = \frac{1}{n} \sum_{m = 1}^n m\operatorname{Kt}(m)[16\operatorname{Ap}(n+1-m) - \operatorname{Ap}(n+2-m)]$$

$$\operatorname{Ap}(n) = \sum_{a = 0}^{n-1} \binom{2a}{a}^2 \binom{2n-2-2a}{n-1-a}^2$$

This formula creates the Kotěšovec sequence too, but it only creates the sequence numbers of even indices:

$$\operatorname{Kt}(2n) = \frac{1}{2} \sum_{m = 1}^{2n-1} (-1)^{2n - m + 1}16^{2n - m}\binom{2n-1}{m - 1} \operatorname{Kt}(m)$$

The Apéry sequence $\operatorname{Ap}(n)$ was researched especially by the mathematicians Sun Zhi-Hong and Reinhard Zumkeller. And that sequence generates the square of the complete elliptic integral of the first kind:

$$4\pi^{-2}K(x)^2 = 1 + \sum_{n = 1}^\infty \frac{\operatorname{Ap}(n + 1)x^{2n}}{16^n}$$

The first numerical values of the central binomial coefficients and the two numerical sequences described are listed in the following table:

Index n	Central binomial coefficient square $\frac{[(2n-2)!]^2}{[(n-1)!]^4}$	Sequence number Ap(n)	Sequence number Kt(n)
1	1	1	1
2	4	8	8
3	36	88	84
4	400	1088	992
5	4900	14296	12514
6	63504	195008	164688
7	853776	2728384	2232200
8	11778624	38879744	30920128
9	165636900	561787864	435506703
10	2363904400	8206324928	6215660600
11	34134779536	120929313088	89668182220
12	497634306624	1794924383744	1305109502496
13	7312459672336	26802975999424	19138260194422
14	108172480360000	402298219288064	282441672732656
15	1609341595560000	6064992788397568	4191287776164504
16	24061445010950400	91786654611673088	62496081197436736
17	361297635242552100	1393772628452578264	935823746406530603

Václav Kotěšovec wrote down the number sequence $\operatorname{Kt}(n)$ on the Online Encyclopedia of Integer Sequences up to the seven hundredth sequence number.

Here one example of the Kotěšovec sequence is computed:

${\color{blue}1} \times {\color{blue}63504} + {\color{blue}4} \times {\color{blue}4900} + {\color{blue}36} \times {\color{blue}400} + {\color{blue}400} \times {\color{blue}36} + {\color{blue}4900} \times {\color{blue}4} + {\color{blue}63504} \times {\color{blue}1} = {\color{RoyalBlue}195008}$

$\tfrac{1}{5} \times {\color{ForestGreen}1} \times (16 \times {\color{RoyalBlue}14296} - {\color{RoyalBlue}195008}) + \tfrac{2}{5} \times {\color{ForestGreen}8} \times (16 \times {\color{RoyalBlue}1088} - {\color{RoyalBlue}14296}) + \tfrac{3}{5} \times {\color{ForestGreen}84} \times (16 \times {\color{RoyalBlue}88} - {\color{RoyalBlue}1088}) + {}$

${} + \tfrac{4}{5} \times {\color{ForestGreen}992} \times (16 \times {\color{RoyalBlue}8} - {\color{RoyalBlue}88}) + \tfrac{5}{5} \times {\color{ForestGreen}12514} \times (16 \times {\color{RoyalBlue}1} - {\color{RoyalBlue}8}) = {\color{ForestGreen}164688}$

== Function values ==
The two following lists contain many function values of the nome function:

The first list shows pairs of values with mutually Pythagorean complementary modules:

$$q(\tfrac{1}{2}\sqrt{2}) = \exp(-\pi)$$
$$q[\tfrac{1}{4}(\sqrt{6} - \sqrt{2})] = \exp(-\sqrt{3}\,\pi)$$
$$q[\tfrac{1}{4}(\sqrt{6} + \sqrt{2})] = \exp(-\tfrac{1}{3}\sqrt{3}\,\pi)$$
$$q\bigl\{\sin\bigl[\tfrac{1}{2}\arcsin(\sqrt{5} - 2)\bigr]\bigr\} = \exp(-\sqrt{5}\,\pi)$$
$$q\bigl\{\cos\bigl[\tfrac{1}{2}\arcsin(\sqrt{5} - 2)\bigr]\bigr\} = \exp(-\tfrac{1}{5}\sqrt{5}\,\pi)$$
$$q[\tfrac{1}{8}(3\sqrt{2} - \sqrt{14})] = \exp(-\sqrt{7}\,\pi)$$
$$q[\tfrac{1}{8}(3\sqrt{2} + \sqrt{14})] = \exp(-\tfrac{1}{7}\sqrt{7}\,\pi)$$
$$q[\tfrac{1}{2}(\sqrt{3} - 1)(\sqrt{2} - \sqrt[4]{3})] = \exp(-3\pi)$$
$$q[\tfrac{1}{2}(\sqrt{3} - 1)(\sqrt{2} + \sqrt[4]{3})] = \exp(-\tfrac{1}{3}\pi)$$
$$q\bigl[\tfrac{1}{16}\bigl(\sqrt{22} + 3\sqrt{2}\bigr)\bigl(\tfrac{1}{3}\sqrt[3]{6\sqrt{3} + 2\sqrt{11}} - \tfrac{1}{3}\sqrt[3]{6\sqrt{3} - 2\sqrt{11}} + \tfrac{1}{3}\sqrt{11} - 1\bigr)^4\bigr] = \exp(-\sqrt{11}\,\pi)$$
$$q\bigl[\tfrac{1}{16}\bigl(\sqrt{22} - 3\sqrt{2}\bigr)\bigl(\tfrac{1}{3}\sqrt[3]{6\sqrt{3} + 2\sqrt{11}} - \tfrac{1}{3}\sqrt[3]{6\sqrt{3} - 2\sqrt{11}} + \tfrac{1}{3}\sqrt{11} + 1\bigr)^4\bigr] = \exp(-\tfrac{1}{11}\sqrt{11}\,\pi)$$
$$q\bigl\{\sin\bigl[\tfrac{1}{2}\arcsin(5\sqrt{13} - 18)\bigr]\bigr\} = \exp(-\sqrt{13}\,\pi)$$
$$q\bigl\{\cos\bigl[\tfrac{1}{2}\arcsin(5\sqrt{13} - 18)\bigr]\bigr\} = \exp(-\tfrac{1}{13}\sqrt{13}\,\pi)$$

The second list shows pairs of values with mutually tangentially complementary modules:

$$q(\sqrt{2} - 1) = \exp(-\sqrt{2}\,\pi)$$
$$q[(2 - \sqrt{3})(\sqrt{3} - \sqrt{2})] = \exp(-\sqrt{6}\,\pi)$$
$$q[(2 - \sqrt{3})(\sqrt{3} + \sqrt{2})] = \exp(-\tfrac{1}{3}\sqrt{6}\,\pi)$$
$$q[(\sqrt{10} - 3)(\sqrt{2} - 1)^2] = \exp(-\sqrt{10}\,\pi)$$
$$q[(\sqrt{10} - 3)(\sqrt{2} + 1)^2] = \exp(-\tfrac{1}{5}\sqrt{10}\,\pi)$$
$$q\bigl[\tfrac{1}{16}\sqrt{2\sqrt{2} - \sqrt{7}}\,(3\sqrt{2} - \sqrt{14})(\sqrt{2\sqrt{2} + 1} - 1)^4\bigr] = \exp(-\sqrt{14}\,\pi)$$
$$q\bigl[\tfrac{1}{16}\sqrt{2\sqrt{2} + \sqrt{7}}\,(3\sqrt{2} + \sqrt{14})(\sqrt{2\sqrt{2} + 1} - 1)^4\bigr] = \exp(-\tfrac{1}{7}\sqrt{14}\,\pi)$$
$$q[(2 - \sqrt{3})^2 (\sqrt{2} - 1)^3] = \exp(-3\sqrt{2}\,\pi)$$
$$q[(2 + \sqrt{3})^2 (\sqrt{2} - 1)^3] = \exp(-\tfrac{1}{3}\sqrt{2}\,\pi)$$
$$q[(10 - 3\sqrt{11})(3\sqrt{11} - 7\sqrt{2})] = \exp(-\sqrt{22}\,\pi)$$
$$q[(10 - 3\sqrt{11})(3\sqrt{11} + 7\sqrt{2})] = \exp(-\tfrac{1}{11}\sqrt{22}\,\pi)$$
$$q\bigl\{(\sqrt{26}+5)(\sqrt{2}-1)^2 \tan\bigl[\tfrac{1}{4}\pi-\arctan(\tfrac{1}{3}\sqrt[3]{3\sqrt{3}+\sqrt{26}}-\tfrac{1}{3}\sqrt[3]{3\sqrt{3}-\sqrt{26}}+\tfrac{1}{6}\sqrt{26}-\tfrac{1}{2}\sqrt{2})\bigr]^4\bigr\} = \exp(-\sqrt{26}\,\pi)$$
$$q\bigl\{(\sqrt{26}+5)(\sqrt{2}+1)^2 \tan\bigl[\arctan(\tfrac{1}{3}\sqrt[3]{3\sqrt{3}+\sqrt{26}}-\tfrac{1}{3}\sqrt[3]{3\sqrt{3}-\sqrt{26}}+\tfrac{1}{6}\sqrt{26}+\tfrac{1}{2}\sqrt{2})-\tfrac{1}{4}\pi\bigr]^4\bigr\} = \exp(-\tfrac{1}{13}\sqrt{26}\,\pi)$$

Related quartets of values are shown below:

$q\bigl\langle\tan\{\tfrac{1}{2}\arctan[(\sqrt{10} - 3)^2 (\sqrt{5} - 2)^2]\}\bigr\rangle = \exp(-\sqrt{30}\,\pi)$

$q\bigl\langle\tan\{\tfrac{1}{2}\arctan[(\sqrt{10} - 3)^2 (\sqrt{5} + 2)^2]\}\bigr\rangle = \exp(-\tfrac{1}{3}\sqrt{30}\,\pi)$

$q\bigl\langle\tan\{\tfrac{1}{2}\arctan[(\sqrt{10} + 3)^2 (\sqrt{5} - 2)^2]\}\bigr\rangle = \exp(-\tfrac{1}{5}\sqrt{30}\,\pi)$

$q\bigl\langle\tan\{\tfrac{1}{2}\arctan[(\sqrt{10} + 3)^2 (\sqrt{5} + 2)^2]\}\bigr\rangle = \exp(-\tfrac{1}{15}\sqrt{30}\,\pi)$

$q\bigl\langle\tan\{\tfrac{1}{2}\arctan[(2\sqrt{7} - 3\sqrt{3})^2 (2\sqrt{2} - \sqrt{7})^2]\}\bigr\rangle = \exp(-\sqrt{42}\,\pi)$

$q\bigl\langle\tan\{\tfrac{1}{2}\arctan[(2\sqrt{7} - 3\sqrt{3})^2 (2\sqrt{2} + \sqrt{7})^2]\}\bigr\rangle = \exp(-\tfrac{1}{3}\sqrt{42}\,\pi)$

$q\bigl\langle\tan\{\tfrac{1}{2}\arctan[(2\sqrt{7} + 3\sqrt{3})^2 (2\sqrt{2} - \sqrt{7})^2]\}\bigr\rangle = \exp(-\tfrac{1}{7}\sqrt{42}\,\pi)$

$q\bigl\langle\tan\{\tfrac{1}{2}\arctan[(2\sqrt{7} + 3\sqrt{3})^2 (2\sqrt{2} + \sqrt{7})^2]\}\bigr\rangle = \exp(-\tfrac{1}{21}\sqrt{42}\,\pi)$

$q\bigl\langle\tan\{\tfrac{1}{2}\arctan[(\sqrt{5} - 2)^4 (\sqrt{2} - 1)^6]\}\bigr\rangle = \exp(-\sqrt{70}\,\pi)$

$q\bigl\langle\tan\{\tfrac{1}{2}\arctan[(\sqrt{5} - 2)^4 (\sqrt{2} + 1)^6]\}\bigr\rangle = \exp(-\tfrac{1}{5}\sqrt{70}\,\pi)$

$q\bigl\langle\tan\{\tfrac{1}{2}\arctan[(\sqrt{5} + 2)^4 (\sqrt{2} - 1)^6]\}\bigr\rangle = \exp(-\tfrac{1}{7}\sqrt{70}\,\pi)$

$q\bigl\langle\tan\{\tfrac{1}{2}\arctan[(\sqrt{5} + 2)^4 (\sqrt{2} + 1)^6]\}\bigr\rangle = \exp(-\tfrac{1}{35}\sqrt{70}\,\pi)$

== Sums and products ==
=== Sum series ===
The elliptic nome was explored by Richard Dedekind and this function is the fundament in the theory of eta functions and their related functions. The elliptic nome is the initial point of the construction of the Lambert series. In the theta function by Carl Gustav Jacobi the nome as an abscissa is assigned to algebraic combinations of the Arithmetic geometric mean and also the complete elliptic integral of the first kind. Many infinite series can be described easily in terms of the elliptic nome:

$$\sum_{n = 1}^{\infty}  q(x)^{\Box(n)} = \tfrac{1}{2}\vartheta_{00}[q(x)] - \tfrac{1}{2} = \tfrac{1}{2}\sqrt{2\pi^{-1}K(x)} - \tfrac{1}{2} = \tfrac{1}{2}\operatorname{agm}(1-x;1+x)^{-1/2} - \tfrac{1}{2}$$
$$\sum_{n = 1}^{\infty}  q(x)^{\Box(2n-1)} = \tfrac{1}{4}\vartheta_{00}[q(x)] - \tfrac{1}{4}\vartheta_{01}[q(x)] = \tfrac{1}{4}(1-\sqrt[4]{1-x^2})\sqrt{2\pi^{-1}K(x)}$$
$$\sum_{n = 1}^{\infty} \frac{2q(x)^{n}}{q(x)^{2n} + 1} = \tfrac{1}{2}\vartheta_{00}[q(x)]^2 - \tfrac{1}{2} = \pi^{-1}K(x) - \tfrac{1}{2}$$
$$\sum_{n = 1}^{\infty} \frac{2q(x)^{2n-1}}{q(x)^{4n-2} + 1} = \tfrac{1}{4}\vartheta_{00}[q(x)]^2 - \tfrac{1}{4}\vartheta_{01}[q(x)]^2 = \tfrac{1}{2}(1-\sqrt{1-x^2})\pi^{-1}K(x)$$
$$\sum_{n = 1}^{\infty}  \Box(n) q(x)^{\Box(n)} = 2^{-1/2}\pi^{-5/2}K(x)^{3/2}[E(x)-(1-x^2)K(x)]$$
$$\sum_{n = 1}^{\infty} \biggl[\frac{2q(x)^{n}}{1 + q(x)^{2n}}\biggr]^2 = 2\pi^{-2}E(x)K(x) - \tfrac{1}{2}$$
$$\sum_{n = 1}^{\infty} \biggl[\frac{2q(x)^{n}}{1 - q(x)^{2n}}\biggr]^2 = \tfrac{2}{3}\pi^{-2}(2 - x^2)K(x)^2 - 2\pi^{-2}K(x)E(x) + \tfrac{1}{6}$$

The quadrangle represents the square number of index n, because in this way of notation the two in the exponent of the exponent would appear to small. So this formula is valid: $\Box(n)=n^2$

The letter $\operatorname{E}(\varepsilon)$ describes the complete elliptic integral of the second kind, which is the quarter periphery of an ellipse in relation to the bigger half axis of the ellipse with the numerical eccentricity $\varepsilon$ as abscissa value.

=== Product series ===
The two most important theta functions can be defined by following product series:

$$\prod_{n = 1}^{\infty} [1-q(x)^{2n}][1+q(x)^{2n-1}]^2 = \vartheta_{00}[q(x)] = \sqrt{2\pi^{-1}K(x)}$$
$$\prod_{n = 1}^{\infty} [1-q(x)^{2n}][1-q(x)^{2n-1}]^2 = \vartheta_{01}[q(x)] = \sqrt[4]{1-x^2}\sqrt{2\pi^{-1}K(x)}$$

Furthermore, these two Pochhammer products have those two relations:

$$q(\varepsilon)[q(\varepsilon);q(\varepsilon)]_{\infty}^{24} = 256\,\varepsilon^2 (1 - \varepsilon^2)^4 \pi^{-{12}}K(\varepsilon)^{12}$$
$$\varepsilon^2 [q(\varepsilon);q(\varepsilon)^2]_{\infty}^{24} = 16\,(1 - \varepsilon^2)^2 q(\varepsilon)$$

The Pochhammer products have an important role in the pentagonal number theorem and its derivation.

== Relation to other functions ==
=== Complete elliptic integrals ===
The nome function can be used for the definition of the complete elliptic integrals of first and second kind:

$$K(\varepsilon) = \tfrac{1}{2}\pi\,\vartheta_{00}[q(\varepsilon)]^2$$
$$E(\varepsilon) = 2\pi q(\varepsilon)\,\vartheta_{00}'[q(\varepsilon)]\vartheta_{00}[q(\varepsilon)]^{-3} + \tfrac{1}{2}\pi(1 - \varepsilon^2)\,\vartheta_{00}[q(\varepsilon)]^2$$

In this case the dash in the exponent position stands for the derivative of the so-called theta zero value function:

$$\vartheta_{00}'(x) = \frac{\mathrm{d}}{\mathrm{d}x}\,\vartheta_{00}(x) = 2 + \sum_{n = 1}^{\infty} 2(n + 1)^2 x^{n(n+2)}$$

=== Definitions of Jacobi functions ===
The elliptic functions Zeta Amplitudinis and Delta Amplitudinis can be defined with the elliptic nome function easily:

$$\operatorname{zn}(x;k) = \sum_{n = 1}^{\infty} \frac{2\pi K(k)^{-1}\sin[\pi K(k)^{-1}x]q(k)^{2n-1}}{1-2\cos[\pi K(k)^{-1}x]q(k)^{2n-1}+q(k)^{4n-2}}$$
$$\operatorname{dn}(x;k) = \sqrt[4]{1-k^2}\prod_{n = 1}^{\infty} \frac{1+2\cos[\pi K(k)^{-1}x]q(k)^{2n-1}+q(k)^{4n-2}}{1-2\cos[\pi K(k)^{-1}x]q(k)^{2n-1}+q(k)^{4n-2}}$$

Using the fourth root of the quotient of the nome divided by the square function as it was mentioned above, following product series definitions can be set up for the Amplitude Sine, the Counter Amplitude Sine and the Amplitude Cosine in this way:

$$\operatorname{sn}(x;k) = 2\sqrt[4]{k^{-2}q(k)}\,\sin[\tfrac{1}{2}\pi K(k)^{-1}x]\prod_{n = 1}^{\infty} \frac{1 - 2q(k)^{2n}\cos[\pi K(k)^{-1}x] + q(k)^{4n}}{1 - 2q(k)^{2n - 1}\cos[\pi K(k)^{-1}x] + q(k)^{4n - 2}}$$
$$\operatorname{cd}(x;k) = 2\sqrt[4]{k^{-2}q(k)}\,\cos[\tfrac{1}{2}\pi K(k)^{-1}x]\prod_{n = 1}^{\infty} \frac{1 + 2q(k)^{2n}\cos[\pi K(k)^{-1}x] + q(k)^{4n}}{1 + 2q(k)^{2n - 1}\cos[\pi K(k)^{-1}x] + q(k)^{4n - 2}}$$
$$\operatorname{cn}(x;k) = 2\sqrt[4]{k^{-2}(1 - k^2)\,q(k)}\,\cos[\tfrac{1}{2}\pi K(k)^{-1}x]\prod_{n = 1}^{\infty} \frac{1 + 2q(k)^{2n}\cos[\pi K(k)^{-1}x] + q(k)^{4n}}{1 - 2q(k)^{2n - 1}\cos[\pi K(k)^{-1}x] + q(k)^{4n - 2}}$$

These five formulas are valid for all values k from −1 until +1.

Then following successive definition of the other Jacobi functions is possible:

$$\operatorname{sn}(x;k) = \frac{2\{\operatorname{zn}(\tfrac{1}{2}x;k) + \operatorname{zn}[K(k)-\tfrac{1}{2}x;k]\}}{k^2+\{\operatorname{zn}(\tfrac{1}{2}x;k) + \operatorname{zn}[K(k)-\tfrac{1}{2}x;k]\}^2}$$
$$\operatorname{cd}(x;k) = \operatorname{sn}[K(k) - x;k]$$
$$\operatorname{cn}(x;k) = \operatorname{cd}(x;k)\operatorname{dn}(x;k)$$
$$\operatorname{dn}(x;k) = \frac{k^2-\{\operatorname{zn}(\tfrac{1}{2}x;k) + \operatorname{zn}[K(k)-\tfrac{1}{2}x;k]\}^2}{k^2+\{\operatorname{zn}(\tfrac{1}{2}x;k) + \operatorname{zn}[K(k)-\tfrac{1}{2}x;k]\}^2}$$

The product definition of the amplitude sine was written down in the essay π and the AGM by the Borwein brothers on page 60 and this formula is based on the theta function definition of Whittaker und Watson.

=== Identities of Jacobi Amplitude functions ===
In combination with the theta functions the nome gives the values of many Jacobi amplitude function values:

$$\operatorname{sc}[\tfrac{2}{3}K(k);k] = \frac{\sqrt{3}\,\vartheta_{01}[q(k)^6]}{\sqrt{1 - k^2}\,\vartheta_{01}[q(k)^2]}$$
$$\operatorname{sn}[\tfrac{1}{3}K(k);k] = \frac{2\vartheta_{00}[q(k)]^2}{3\vartheta_{00}[q(k)^3]^2 + \vartheta_{00}[q(k)]^2} = \frac{3\vartheta_{01}[q(k)^3]^2 - \vartheta_{01}[q(k)]^2}{3\vartheta_{01}[q(k)^3]^2 + \vartheta_{01}[q(k)]^2}$$
$$\operatorname{cn}[\tfrac{2}{3}K(k);k] = \frac{3\vartheta_{00}[q(k)^3]^2 - \vartheta_{00}[q(k)]^2}{3\vartheta_{00}[q(k)^3]^2 + \vartheta_{00}[q(k)]^2} = \frac{2\vartheta_{01}[q(k)]^2}{3\vartheta_{01}[q(k)^3]^2 + \vartheta_{01}[q(k)]^2}$$
$$\operatorname{sn}[\tfrac{1}{5}K(k);k] = \biggl\{\frac{\sqrt{5}\,\vartheta_{01}[q(k)^5]}{\vartheta_{01}[q(k)]} - 1\biggr\}\biggl\{\frac{5\vartheta_{01}[q(k)^{10}]^2}{\vartheta_{01}[q(k)^2]^2} - 1\biggr\}^{-1}$$
$$\operatorname{sn}[\tfrac{3}{5}K(k);k] = \biggl\{\frac{\sqrt{5}\,\vartheta_{01}[q(k)^5]}{\vartheta_{01}[q(k)]} + 1\biggr\}\biggl\{\frac{5\vartheta_{01}[q(k)^{10}]^2}{\vartheta_{01}[q(k)^2]^2} - 1\biggr\}^{-1}$$
$$\operatorname{cn}[\tfrac{2}{5}K(k);k] = \biggl\{\frac{\sqrt{5}\,\vartheta_{00}[q(k)^5]}{\vartheta_{00}[q(k)]} + 1\biggr\}\biggl\{\frac{5\vartheta_{01}[q(k)^{10}]^2}{\vartheta_{01}[q(k)^2]^2} - 1\biggr\}^{-1}$$
$$\operatorname{cn}[\tfrac{4}{5}K(k);k] = \biggl\{\frac{\sqrt{5}\,\vartheta_{00}[q(k)^5]}{\vartheta_{00}[q(k)]} - 1\biggr\}\biggl\{\frac{5\vartheta_{01}[q(k)^{10}]^2}{\vartheta_{01}[q(k)^2]^2} - 1\biggr\}^{-1}$$

The abbreviation sc describes the quotient of the amplitude sine divided by the amplitude cosine.

== Theorems and Identities ==
=== Derivation of the nome square theorem ===
The law for the square of the elliptic noun involves forming the Landen daughter modulus:

$q(\varepsilon)^2 = q\bigl[\varepsilon^2(1+\sqrt{1-\varepsilon^2})^{-2}\bigr] = q\bigl\{\tan\bigl[\tfrac{1}{2}\arcsin(\varepsilon)\bigr]^2\bigr\} = q\bigl\{\operatorname{tanh}\bigl[\tfrac{1}{2}\operatorname{artanh}(\varepsilon)\bigr]^2\bigr\}$

The Landen daughter modulus is also the tangential counterpart of the Pythagorean counterpart of the mother modulus.

This formula results as a combination of the following equations:

$$(1 + \sqrt{1 - \varepsilon^2})F\bigl[\arctan(x);\varepsilon\bigr] = F\bigl[\arctan(x) + \arctan(\sqrt{1 - \varepsilon^2}\,x);\varepsilon^2(1+\sqrt{1-\varepsilon^2})^{-2}\bigr]$$

The differential quotient of this equation balance along with $w$ confirms the correctness of this formula. Because on both sides of the equation scale the differential quotient along w is the same and the functions on both sides of the scale run through the coordinate origin with respect to w.

The next equation follows directly from the previous equation:

$$(1 + \sqrt{1 - \varepsilon^2})K(\varepsilon) = 2K\bigl[\varepsilon^2(1+\sqrt{1-\varepsilon^2})^{-2}\bigr]$$

By changing the substitution this expression is generated:

$$K\bigl[2\sqrt[4]{1 - \varepsilon^2}(1+\sqrt{1-\varepsilon^2})^{-1}\bigr] = (1 + \sqrt{1 - \varepsilon^2})K(\sqrt{1-\varepsilon^2})$$

The combination of both formulas leads to that quotient equation:

$${\color{blue}2\,\frac{K(\sqrt{1-\varepsilon^2})}{K(\varepsilon)}} = {\color{green}\frac{K[2\sqrt[4]{1 - \varepsilon^2}(1+\sqrt{1-\varepsilon^2})^{-1}]}{K[\varepsilon^2(1+\sqrt{1-\varepsilon^2})^{-2}]}}$$

Both sides of this equation scale show period ratios.

For on both sides of this balance the modulus in the numerator is Pythagorean complementary to the modulus in the denominator.

The elliptic nome is defined as an exponential function from the negative circle number times the real period ratio.

And the real period ratio is defined as the quotient of the K integral of the Pythagorean complementary modulus divided by the K integral of the modulus itself.

This is the consequence:

$$q(\varepsilon)^2 = \exp\biggl[-\pi \,\frac{K'(\varepsilon)}{K(\varepsilon)}\biggr]^2 = \exp\biggl[-\pi \,\frac{K(\sqrt{1 - \varepsilon^2})}{K(\varepsilon)}\biggr]^2 = \exp\biggl\{-\pi \biggl[{\color{blue}2\,\frac{K(\sqrt{1 - \varepsilon^2})}{K(\varepsilon)}}\biggr]\biggr\} =$$

$$= \exp\biggl\{-\pi \,{\color{green}\frac{K[2\sqrt[4]{1 - \varepsilon^2}(1+\sqrt{1-\varepsilon^2})^{-1}]}{K[\varepsilon^2(1+\sqrt{1-\varepsilon^2})^{-2}]}}\biggr\} = \exp\biggl\{-\pi \,\frac{K'[\varepsilon^2(1+\sqrt{1-\varepsilon^2})^{-2}]}{K[\varepsilon^2(1+\sqrt{1-\varepsilon^2})^{-2}]}\biggr\} = q\bigl[\varepsilon^2(1+\sqrt{1-\varepsilon^2})^{-2}\bigr]$$

QUOD ERAT DEMONSTRANDUM!

=== Examples for the nome square theorem ===
The Landen daughter modulus is identical to the tangential opposite of the Pythagorean opposite of the mother modulus.

Three examples shall be shown in the following:

Trigonometrically displayed examples:

$$\exp(-2\sqrt{3}\,\pi) = \exp(-\sqrt{3}\,\pi)^2 = q\bigl[\sin(\tfrac{1}{12}\pi)\bigr]^2 = q\bigl[\tan(\tfrac{1}{24}\pi)^2\bigr]$$

$$\exp(-2\sqrt{5}\,\pi) = \exp(-\sqrt{5}\,\pi)^2 = q\bigl\{\sin\bigl[\tfrac{1}{2}\arcsin(\sqrt{5} - 2)\bigr]\bigr\}^2 = q\bigl\{\tan\bigl[\tfrac{1}{4}\arcsin(\sqrt{5} - 2)\bigr]^2\bigr\}$$

$$\exp(-2\sqrt{7}\,\pi) = \exp(-\sqrt{7}\,\pi)^2 = q\bigl\{\sin\bigl[\tfrac{1}{2}\arcsin(\tfrac{1}{8})\bigr]\bigr\}^2 = q\bigl\{\tan\bigl[\tfrac{1}{4}\arcsin(\tfrac{1}{8})\bigr]^2\bigr\}$$

$$\exp(-2\sqrt{13}\,\pi) = \exp(-\sqrt{13}\,\pi)^2 = q\bigl\{\sin\bigl[\tfrac{1}{2}\arcsin(5\sqrt{13} - 18)\bigr]\bigr\}^2 = q\bigl\{\tan\bigl[\tfrac{1}{4}\arcsin(5\sqrt{13} - 18)\bigr]^2\bigr\}$$

Hyperbolically displayed examples:

$$\exp(-2\sqrt{6}\,\pi) = \exp(-\sqrt{6}\,\pi)^2 =$$

$$= q\biggl\langle\operatorname{tanh}\bigl\{\tfrac{1}{2}\operatorname{arsinh}\bigl[(\sqrt{2} - 1)^2\bigr]\bigr\}\biggr\rangle^2 = q\biggl\langle\operatorname{tanh}\bigl\{\tfrac{1}{4}\operatorname{arsinh}\bigl[(\sqrt{2} - 1)^2\bigr]\bigr\}^2\biggr\rangle$$

$$\exp(-2\sqrt{10}\,\pi) = \exp(-\sqrt{10}\,\pi)^2 =$$

$$= q\biggl\langle\operatorname{tanh}\bigl\{\tfrac{1}{2}\operatorname{arsinh}\bigl[(\sqrt{5} - 2)^2\bigr]\bigr\}\biggr\rangle^2 = q\biggl\langle\operatorname{tanh}\bigl\{\tfrac{1}{4}\operatorname{arsinh}\bigl[(\sqrt{5} - 2)^2\bigr]\bigr\}^2\biggr\rangle$$

$$\exp(-2\sqrt{14}\,\pi) = \exp(-\sqrt{14}\,\pi)^2 =$$

$$= q\biggl\langle\operatorname{tanh}\bigl\{\tfrac{1}{2}\operatorname{arsinh}\bigl[(\sqrt{2} + \tfrac{1}{2} - \tfrac{1}{2}\sqrt{4\sqrt{2} + 5})^3\bigr]\bigr\}\biggr\rangle^2 = q\biggl\langle\operatorname{tanh}\bigl\{\tfrac{1}{4}\operatorname{arsinh}\bigl[(\sqrt{2} + \tfrac{1}{2} - \tfrac{1}{2}\sqrt{4\sqrt{2} + 5})^3\bigr]\bigr\}^2\biggr\rangle$$

$$\exp(-2\sqrt{22}\,\pi) = \exp(-\sqrt{22}\,\pi)^2 =$$

$$= q\biggl\langle\operatorname{tanh}\bigl\{\tfrac{1}{2}\operatorname{arsinh}\bigl[(\sqrt{2} - 1)^6\bigr]\bigr\}\biggr\rangle^2 = q\biggl\langle\operatorname{tanh}\bigl\{\tfrac{1}{4}\operatorname{arsinh}\bigl[(\sqrt{2} - 1)^6\bigr]\bigr\}^2\biggr\rangle$$

=== Derivation of the parametrized nome cube theorem ===
Not only the law for the square but also the law for the cube of the elliptic nome leads to an elementary modulus transformation. This parameterized formula for the cube of the elliptic noun is valid for all values −1 < u < 1.

$q[u(\sqrt{u^4-u^2+1}-u^2+1)]^3 = q[u(\sqrt{u^4-u^2+1}+u^2-1)]$

This formula was displayed exactly like this and this time it was not printed exactly after the expression $\varepsilon$ with the main alignment on the mother modulus, because this formula contains a long formulation. And in the formula shown now with the parameter $u$, a greatly simplified formula emerges.

This formula results as a combination of the following equations:

$$(2\sqrt{u^4-u^2+1}-2u^2+1)F\bigl[\arctan(w);u(\sqrt{u^4-u^2+1}-u^2+1)\bigr] =$$
$$= F\bigl\{\arctan(w) + 2\arctan\bigl[(\sqrt{u^4-u^2+1}-u^2)\,w\bigr];u(\sqrt{u^4-u^2+1}+u^2-1)\bigr\}$$

The differential quotient of this equation balance along with $w$ confirms the correctness of this formula. Because on both sides of the equation scale the differential quotient along w is the same and the functions on both sides of the scale run through the coordinate origin with respect to w.

The next equation follows directly from the previous equation:

$$(2\sqrt{u^4-u^2+1}-2u^2+1)K\bigl[u(\sqrt{u^4-u^2+1}-u^2+1)\bigr] = 3K\bigl[u(\sqrt{u^4-u^2+1}+u^2-1)\bigr]$$

By changing the substitution this expression is generated:

$$K\bigl[\sqrt{1-u^2}(\sqrt{u^4-u^2+1}+u^2)\bigr] = (2\sqrt{u^4-u^2+1}-2u^2+1)K\bigl[\sqrt{1-u^2}(\sqrt{u^4-u^2+1}-u^2)\bigr]$$

The combination of both formulas leads to that quotient equation:

$${\color{blue}3\,\frac{K[\sqrt{1-u^2}(\sqrt{u^4-u^2+1}-u^2)]}{K[u(\sqrt{u^4-u^2+1}-u^2+1)]}} = {\color{green}\frac{K[\sqrt{1-u^2}(\sqrt{u^4-u^2+1}+u^2)]}{K[u(\sqrt{u^4-u^2+1}+u^2-1)]}}$$

Both sides of this equation scale show period ratios.

For on both sides of this balance the modulus in the numerator is Pythagorean complementary to the modulus in the denominator.

The elliptic nome is defined as an exponential function from the negative circle number times the real period ratio.

And the real period ratio is defined as the quotient of the K integral of the Pythagorean complementary modulus divided by the K integral of the modulus itself.

This is the consequence:

$$q\bigl[u(\sqrt{u^4-u^2+1}-u^2+1)\bigr]^3 = \exp\biggl\{-\pi \,\frac{K'[u(\sqrt{u^4-u^2+1}-u^2+1)]}{K[u(\sqrt{u^4-u^2+1}-u^2+1)]}\biggr\}^3 =$$
$$= \exp\biggl\{-\pi \,\frac{K[\sqrt{1 - u^2}(\sqrt{u^4-u^2+1}-u^2)]}{K[u(\sqrt{u^4-u^2+1}-u^2+1)]}\biggr\}^3 = \exp\biggl\langle -\pi \biggl\{{\color{blue}3\,\frac{K[\sqrt{1 - u^2}(\sqrt{u^4-u^2+1}-u^2)]}{K[u(\sqrt{u^4-u^2+1}-u^2+1)]}}\biggr\}\biggr\rangle =$$
$$= \exp\biggl\{-\pi \,{\color{green}\frac{K[\sqrt{1 - u^2}(\sqrt{u^4-u^2+1}+u^2)]}{K[u(\sqrt{u^4-u^2+1}+u^2-1)]}}\biggr\} = \exp\biggl\{-\pi \,\frac{K'[u(\sqrt{u^4-u^2+1}+u^2-1)]}{K[u(\sqrt{u^4-u^2+1}+u^2-1)]}\biggr\} = q\bigl[u(\sqrt{u^4-u^2+1}+u^2-1)\bigr]$$

QUOD ERAT DEMONSTRANDUM!

=== Derivation of the direct nome cube theorem ===
On the basis of the now absolved proof a direct formula for the nome cube theorem in relation to the modulus $\varepsilon$ and in combination with the Jacobi amplitude sine shall be generated:

The works Analytic Solutions to Algebraic Equations by Johansson and Evaluation of Fifth Degree Elliptic Singular Moduli by Bagis showed in their quotated works that the Jacobi amplitude sine of the third part of the complete first kind integral K solves following quartic equation:

$$\varepsilon^2 x^4 - 2\varepsilon^2 x^3 + 2x - 1 = 0$$

$$x = \text{sn}\bigl[\tfrac{1}{3}K(\varepsilon);\varepsilon\bigr]$$

Now the parametrization mentioned above is inserted into this equation:

$$\varepsilon = u(\sqrt{u^4-u^2+1}-u^2+1)$$

$$u^2(\sqrt{u^4-u^2+1}-u^2+1)^2 (x^4 - 2x^3) + 2x - 1 = 0$$

This is the real solution of the pattern $\tfrac{1}{2} < x < 1 \,\cap \,x \in \R$ of that quartic equation:

$$x = \frac{1}{\sqrt{u^4-u^2+1}-u^2+1}$$

Therefore, following formula is valid:

$$\text{sn}\bigl[\tfrac{1}{3}K(\varepsilon);\varepsilon\bigr] \bigl[\varepsilon = u(\sqrt{u^4-u^2+1}-u^2+1)\bigr] = \frac{1}{\sqrt{u^4-u^2+1}-u^2+1}$$

The parametrized nome cube formula has this mentioned form:

$$q\bigl[u(\sqrt{u^4-u^2+1}-u^2+1)\bigr]^3 = q\bigl[u(\sqrt{u^4-u^2+1}+u^2-1)\bigr]$$

The same formula can be designed in this alternative way:

$$q\bigl[u(\sqrt{u^4-u^2+1}-u^2+1)\bigr]^3 = q\bigl\{\bigl[u(\sqrt{u^4-u^2+1}-u^2+1)\bigr]^3 \bigl(\sqrt{u^4-u^2+1}-u^2+1\bigr)^{-4} \bigr\}$$

So this result appears as the direct nome cube theorem:

$$q(\varepsilon)^3 = q\bigl\{\varepsilon^3 \text{sn}\bigl[\tfrac{1}{3}K(\varepsilon);\varepsilon\bigr]^4 \bigr\}$$

=== Examples for the nome cube theorem ===
Alternatively, this formula can be set up:

$q\bigl\{\tan\bigl[\tfrac{1}{2}\arctan(t^3)\bigr]\bigr\}^3 = q\bigl\{\tan\bigl[\tfrac{1}{2}\arctan(t^3)\bigr]^3 \tan\bigl[\arctan\bigl(\,\sqrt{2\sqrt{t^4 - t^2 + 1} - t^2 + 2} + \sqrt{t^2 + 1}\,\bigr) - \tfrac{1}{4}\pi\bigr]^4\bigr\}$

The now presented formula is used for simplified computations, because the given elliptical modulus can be used to determine the value $t$ in an easy way. The value $t$ can be evoked by taking the tangent duplication of the modulus and then taking the cube root of that in order to get the parameterization value $t$ directly.

Two examples are to be treated exemplarily:

In the first example, the value $t = 1$ is inserted:

$${\color{blue}\exp(-3\sqrt{2}\,\pi)} = \exp(-\sqrt{2}\,\pi)^3 = q(\sqrt{2} - 1)^3 = q\bigl\{\tan\bigl[\tfrac{1}{2}\arctan(1)\bigr]\bigr\}^3 =$$

$$= q\bigl\{\tan\bigl[\tfrac{1}{2}\arctan(1)\bigr]^3 \tan\bigl[\arctan(\sqrt{3} + \sqrt{2}) - \tfrac{1}{4}\pi\bigr]^4\bigr\} = {\color{blue}q\bigl[(\sqrt{2} - 1)^3 (\tfrac{1}{2}\sqrt{6} - \tfrac{1}{2}\sqrt{2})^4\bigr]}$$

In the second example, the value $t = \Phi^{-2} = \tfrac{1}{2}(3 - \sqrt{5})$ is inserted:

$${\color{blue}\exp(-3\sqrt{10}\,\pi)} = \exp(-\sqrt{10}\,\pi)^3 = q\bigl[(\sqrt{10} - 3)(\sqrt{2} - 1)^2\bigr]^3 = q\bigl\{\tan\bigl[\tfrac{1}{2}\arctan(\Phi^{-6})\bigr]\bigr\}^3 =$$

$$= q\bigl\{\tan\bigl[\tfrac{1}{2}\arctan(\Phi^{-6})\bigr]^3 \tan\bigl[\arctan\bigl(\sqrt{2\sqrt{\Phi^{-8} - \Phi^{-4} + 1} - \Phi^{-4} + 2} + \sqrt{\Phi^{-4} + 1}\bigr) - \tfrac{1}{4}\pi\bigr]^4\bigr\} =$$

$$= {\color{blue}q\bigl\{(\sqrt{10} - 3)^3(\sqrt{2} - 1)^6 \tan\bigl[\arctan\bigl(\sqrt{2\sqrt{\Phi^{-8} - \Phi^{-4} + 1} - \Phi^{-4} + 2} + \sqrt{\Phi^{-4} + 1}\bigr) - \tfrac{1}{4}\pi\bigr]^4\bigr\}}$$

The constant $\Phi$ represents the Golden ratio number $\Phi = \tfrac{1}{2}(\sqrt{5} + 1)$ exactly. Indeed, the formula for the cube of the nome involves a modulus transformation that really contains elementary cube roots because it involves the solution of a regular quartic equation. However the laws for the fifth power and the seventh power of the elliptic nome do not lead to an elementary nome transformation, but to a non elementary transformation. This was proven by the Abel–Ruffini theorem and by the Galois theory too.

=== Exponentiation theorems with Jacobi amplitude functions ===
Every power of a nome of a positive algebraic number as base and a positive rational number as exponent is equal to a nome value of a positive algebraic number:

$$q(\varepsilon_1 \in \mathbb{A}^{+})^{w \in \mathbb{Q^{+}}} = q(\varepsilon_2 \in \mathbb{A}^{+})$$

These are the most important examples of the general exponentiation theorem:

$$q(\varepsilon)^2 = q\{\varepsilon^2\operatorname{sn}[\tfrac{1}{2}K(\varepsilon);\varepsilon]^4\} = q[\varepsilon^2(1+\sqrt{1-\varepsilon^2})^{-2}]$$
$$q(\varepsilon)^3 = q\{\varepsilon^3\operatorname{sn}[\tfrac{1}{3}K(\varepsilon);\varepsilon]^4\}$$
$$q(\varepsilon)^4 = q\{\varepsilon^4\operatorname{sn}[\tfrac{1}{4}K(\varepsilon);\varepsilon]^4\operatorname{sn}[\tfrac{3}{4}K(\varepsilon);\varepsilon]^4\} = q[(1-\sqrt[4]{1-\varepsilon^2})^{2}(1+\sqrt[4]{1-\varepsilon^2})^{-2}]$$
$$q(\varepsilon)^5 = q\{\varepsilon^5\operatorname{sn}[\tfrac{1}{5}K(\varepsilon);\varepsilon]^4\operatorname{sn}[\tfrac{3}{5}K(\varepsilon);\varepsilon]^4\}$$
$$q(\varepsilon)^6 = q\{\varepsilon^6\operatorname{sn}[\tfrac{1}{6}K(\varepsilon);\varepsilon]^4\operatorname{sn}[\tfrac{1}{2}K(\varepsilon);\varepsilon]^4\operatorname{sn}[\tfrac{5}{6}K(\varepsilon);\varepsilon]^4\}$$
$$q(\varepsilon)^7 = q\{\varepsilon^7\operatorname{sn}[\tfrac{1}{7}K(\varepsilon);\varepsilon]^4\operatorname{sn}[\tfrac{3}{7}K(\varepsilon);\varepsilon]^4\operatorname{sn}[\tfrac{5}{7}K(\varepsilon);\varepsilon]^4\}$$
$$q(\varepsilon)^8 = q\{\varepsilon^8\operatorname{sn}[\tfrac{1}{8}K(\varepsilon);\varepsilon]^4\operatorname{sn}[\tfrac{3}{8}K(\varepsilon);\varepsilon]^4\operatorname{sn}[\tfrac{5}{8}K(\varepsilon);\varepsilon]^4\operatorname{sn}[\tfrac{7}{8}K(\varepsilon);\varepsilon]^4\}$$
$$q(\varepsilon)^9 = q\{\varepsilon^9\operatorname{sn}[\tfrac{1}{9}K(\varepsilon);\varepsilon]^4\operatorname{sn}[\tfrac{1}{3}K(\varepsilon);\varepsilon]^4\operatorname{sn}[\tfrac{5}{9}K(\varepsilon);\varepsilon]^4\operatorname{sn}[\tfrac{7}{9}K(\varepsilon);\varepsilon]^4\}$$

The abbreviation $\operatorname{sn}$ stands for the Jacobi elliptic function amplitude sine.

For algebraic $x$ values in the real interval $[-1,1]$ the shown amplitude sine expressions are always algebraic.

This are the general exponentiation theorems:

$$q(\varepsilon)^{2n} = q\biggl\{\varepsilon^{2n}\prod_{k = 1}^{n}\operatorname{sn}\bigl[\tfrac{2k-1}{2n}K(\varepsilon);\varepsilon\bigr]^4\biggr\}$$
$$q(\varepsilon)^{2n+1} = q\biggl\{\varepsilon^{2n+1}\prod_{k = 1}^{n}\operatorname{sn}\bigl[\tfrac{2k-1}{2n+1}K(\varepsilon);\varepsilon\bigr]^4\biggr\}$$

That theorem is valid for all natural numbers n.

Important computation clues:

The following Jacobi amplitude sine expressions solve the subsequent equations:

Thirds of the K: $x = \text{sn}[\tfrac{1}{3}K(k);k]$ solves the equation $k^2 x^4 - 2k^2 x^3 + 2x - 1 = 0$	Fifths of the K: $x = \text{sn}[\tfrac{1}{5}K(k);k]\text{sn}[\tfrac{3}{5}K(k);k]$ solves the equation $k^6 x^6 - 4k^6 x^5 + 5k^4 x^4 - 5k^2 x^2 + 4x - 1 = 0$
Sevenths of the K: $x = \text{sn}[\tfrac{1}{7}K(k);k]\text{sn}[\tfrac{3}{7}K(k);k]\text{sn}[\tfrac{5}{7}K(k);k]$ solves the equation $k^{12} x^8 - 8k^{12} x^7 + 28k^{10} x^6 - 56k^8 x^5 + 70k^6 x^4 - 56k^4 x^3 + 28k^2 x^2 - 8x + 1 = 0$ und $(1 - k^2 x)^8 = (1 - k^2)(1 - k^{14} x^8)$
Elevenths of the K: $x = \text{sn}[\tfrac{1}{11}K(k);k]\text{sn}[\tfrac{3}{11}K(k);k]\text{sn}[\tfrac{5}{11}K(k);k]\text{sn}[\tfrac{7}{11}K(k);k]\text{sn}[\tfrac{9}{11}K(k);k]$ solves the equation $k^{30}x^{12} + (-32k^{30} + 22k^{28})x^{11} + 44k^{26}x^{10} - (88k^{24}+22k^{22})x^9 + 165k^{20}x^8 - 132k^{18}x^7 + (-44k^{16} + 44k^{14})x^6 +$$+ 132k^{12}x^5 - 165k^{10}x^4 + (22k^8 + 88k^6)x^3 - 44k^4x^2 + (-22k^2 + 32)x - 1 = 0$

=== Examples for the exponentiation theorems ===
For these nome power theorems important examples shall be formulated:

Given is the fifth power theorem:

$$q(\varepsilon)^5 = q\{\varepsilon^5\operatorname{sn}[\tfrac{1}{5}K(\varepsilon);\varepsilon]^4\operatorname{sn}[\tfrac{3}{5}K(\varepsilon);\varepsilon]^4\}$$

Lemniscatic example for the fifth power theorem:

$\tfrac{1}{8} x^6 - \tfrac{1}{2} x^5 + \tfrac{5}{4} x^4 - \tfrac{5}{2} x^2 + 4x - 1 = 0$

$x = \text{sn}[\tfrac{1}{5}K(k);k]\text{sn}[\tfrac{3}{5}K(k);k](k = \tfrac{1}{2}\sqrt{2}) = \tfrac{1}{2}(\sqrt{5} - 1)(\sqrt[4]{5} - 1)$

${\color{blue}\exp(-5\pi)} = \exp(-\pi)^5 = q(\tfrac{1}{2}\sqrt{2})^5 = q\{\varepsilon^5\operatorname{sn}[\tfrac{1}{5}K(\varepsilon);\varepsilon]^4\operatorname{sn}[\tfrac{3}{5}K(\varepsilon);\varepsilon]^4\} (\varepsilon = \tfrac{1}{2}\sqrt{2}) =$

$= q\bigl\{\tfrac{1}{8}\sqrt{2}\bigl[\tfrac{1}{2}(\sqrt{5} - 1)(\sqrt[4]{5} - 1)\bigr]^4\bigr\} = {\color{blue}q\bigl[\tfrac{1}{2}(\sqrt{10} - 2\sqrt{2})(3 - 2\sqrt[4]{5})\bigr]}$

A next example for the fifth power theorem:

$(\sqrt{2} - 1)^6 x^6 - 4(\sqrt{2} - 1)^6 x^5 + 5(\sqrt{2} - 1)^4 x^4 - 5(\sqrt{2} - 1)^2 x^2 + 4x - 1 = 0$

$x = \text{sn}[\tfrac{1}{5}K(k);k]\text{sn}[\tfrac{3}{5}K(k);k](k = \sqrt{2} - 1) = (\sqrt{2} + 1)\tan\bigl[\arctan\bigl(\tfrac{1}{3}\sqrt{5}-\tfrac{1}{3}\sqrt[3]{6\sqrt{30}+4\sqrt{5}}+\tfrac{1}{3}\sqrt[3]{6\sqrt{30}-4\sqrt{5}}\,\bigr)-\tfrac{1}{8}\pi\bigr]$

${\color{blue}\exp(-5\sqrt{2}\,\pi)} = \exp(-\sqrt{2}\,\pi)^5 = q(\sqrt{2} - 1)^5 =$

$= q\{\varepsilon^5\operatorname{sn}[\tfrac{1}{5}K(\varepsilon);\varepsilon]^4\operatorname{sn}[\tfrac{3}{5}K(\varepsilon);\varepsilon]^4\} (\varepsilon = \sqrt{2} - 1) =$

$= q\biggl\langle (\sqrt{2} - 1)^5\bigl\{(\sqrt{2} + 1)\tan\bigl[\arctan\bigl(\tfrac{1}{3}\sqrt{5}-\tfrac{1}{3}\sqrt[3]{6\sqrt{30}+4\sqrt{5}}+\tfrac{1}{3}\sqrt[3]{6\sqrt{30}-4\sqrt{5}}\,\bigr)-\tfrac{1}{8}\pi\bigr]\bigr\}^4\biggr\rangle =$

$= {\color{blue}q\bigl\{(\sqrt{2}-1) \tan\bigl[\arctan\bigl(\tfrac{1}{3}\sqrt{5}-\tfrac{1}{3}\sqrt[3]{6\sqrt{30}+4\sqrt{5}}+\tfrac{1}{3}\sqrt[3]{6\sqrt{30}-4\sqrt{5}}\,\bigr)-\tfrac{1}{8}\pi\bigr]^4\bigr\}}$

=== Reflection theorems ===
If two positive numbers $a$ and $b$ are Pythagorean opposites to each other and thus the equation $a^2+b^2=1$ is valid, then this relation is valid:

$$\ln[\operatorname{q}(a)]\ln[\operatorname{q}(b)] = \pi^2$$

If two positive numbers $c$ and $d$ are tangential opposites to each other and thus the equation $(c+1)(d+1)=2$ is valid, then that relation is valid:

$$\ln[\operatorname{q}(c)]\ln[\operatorname{q}(d)] = 2\pi^2$$

Therefore, these representations have validity for all real numbers x:

Pythagorean opposites:

$$\ln\biggl\langle q\bigl\{\sin\bigl[\tfrac{1}{4}\pi - \tfrac{1}{2}\arctan(x)\bigr]\bigr\}\biggr\rangle \ln\biggl\langle q\bigl\{\sin\bigl[\tfrac{1}{4}\pi + \tfrac{1}{2}\arctan(x)\bigr]\bigr\}\biggr\rangle = \pi^2$$
$$\ln\bigl\{q\bigl[\tfrac{1}{2}\sqrt{2-2x(x^2+1)^{-1/2}}\bigr] \bigr\} \ln\bigl\{q\bigl[\tfrac{1}{2} \sqrt{2+2x(x^2+1)^{-1/2}}\bigr]\bigr\} = \pi^2$$

Tangential opposites:

$$\ln\biggl\langle q\bigl\{\tan\bigl[\tfrac{1}{8}\pi - \tfrac{1}{4}\arctan(x)\bigr]\bigr\}\biggr\rangle \ln \biggl\langle q \bigl\{\tan\bigl[\tfrac{1}{8}\pi + \tfrac{1}{4}\arctan(x)\bigr] \bigr\} \biggr\rangle = 2\pi^2$$
$$\ln\bigl\{ q\bigl[\sqrt{(\sqrt{x^2+1}+x)^2+1}-\sqrt{x^2+1}-x\bigr]\bigr\} \ln\bigl\{ q \bigl[ \sqrt{(\sqrt{x^2+1}-x)^2+1}-\sqrt{x^2+1}+x\bigr] \bigr\} = 2\pi^2$$

== Derivations of the nome values ==
=== Direct results of mentioned theorems ===
The following examples should be used to determine the nouns:

Example 1: Given is the formula of the Pythagorean counterparts:

$\ln\biggl\langle q\bigl\{\sin\bigl[\tfrac{1}{4}\pi - \tfrac{1}{2}\arctan(x)\bigr]\bigr\}\biggr\rangle \ln\biggl\langle q\bigl\{\sin\bigl[\tfrac{1}{4}\pi + \tfrac{1}{2}\arctan(x)\bigr]\bigr\}\biggr\rangle = \pi^2$

For x = 0, this formula gives this equation:

$$\ln\bigl\{q\bigl[\sin(\tfrac{1}{4}\pi)\bigr]\bigr\}^2 = \pi^2$$
$$q\bigl[\sin(\tfrac{1}{4}\pi)\bigr] = \exp(-\pi)$$

Example 2:

Given is the formula of the tangential counterparts:

$\ln\biggl\langle q\bigl\{\tan\bigl[\tfrac{1}{8}\pi - \tfrac{1}{4}\arctan(x)\bigr]\bigr\}\biggr\rangle \ln \biggl\langle q \bigl\{\tan\bigl[\tfrac{1}{8}\pi + \tfrac{1}{4}\arctan(x)\bigr] \bigr\} \biggr\rangle = 2\pi^2$

For x = 0, the formula for the tangential counterparts gives the following equation:

$$\ln\bigl\{q\bigl[\tan(\tfrac{1}{8}\pi)\bigr]\bigr\}^2 = 2\pi^2$$
$$q\bigl[\tan(\tfrac{1}{8}\pi)\bigr] = \exp(-\sqrt{2}\,\pi)$$

=== Combinations of two theorems each ===
Example 1: Equianharmonic case

The formula of the Pythagorean counterparts is used again:

$\ln\biggl\langle q\bigl\{\sin\bigl[\tfrac{1}{4}\pi - \tfrac{1}{2}\arctan(x)\bigr]\bigr\}\biggr\rangle \ln\biggl\langle q\bigl\{\sin\bigl[\tfrac{1}{4}\pi + \tfrac{1}{2}\arctan(x)\bigr]\bigr\}\biggr\rangle = \pi^2$

For $x = \sqrt{3}$, this equation results from this formula:

$$\ln\bigl\{q\bigl[\sin(\tfrac{1}{12}\pi)\bigr]\bigr\}\ln\bigl\{q\bigl[\sin(\tfrac {5}{12}\pi)\bigr]\bigr\} = \pi^2$$

In a previous section this theorem was stated:

$q[u(\sqrt{u^4-u^2+1}-u^2+1)]^3 = q[u(\sqrt{u^4-u^2+1}+ u^2-1)]$

From this theorem for cubing, the following equation results for $u = 1/\sqrt{2}$:

$$q\bigl[\sin(\tfrac{5}{12}\pi)\bigr]^3 = q\bigl[\sin(\tfrac{1}{12}\pi)\bigr]$$

The solution to the system of equations with two unknowns then reads as follows:

$$q\bigl[\sin(\tfrac{1}{12}\pi)\bigr] = \exp(-\sqrt{3}\,\pi)$$

$$q\bigl[\sin(\tfrac{5}{12}\pi)\bigr] = \exp(-\tfrac{1}{3}\sqrt{3}\,\pi)$$

Example 2: A further case with the cube formula

The formula of the tangential counterparts is used again:

$\ln\biggl\langle q\bigl\{\tan\bigl[\tfrac{1}{8}\pi - \tfrac{1}{4}\arctan(x)\bigr]\bigr\}\biggr\rangle \ln \biggl\langle q \bigl\{\tan\bigl[\tfrac{1}{8}\pi + \tfrac{1}{4}\arctan(x)\bigr] \bigr\} \biggr\rangle = 2\pi^2$

For $x = \sqrt{8}$ this formula results in the following equation:

$$\ln\bigl\{q\bigl[(2 - \sqrt{3})(\sqrt{3} - \sqrt{2})\bigr]\bigr\}\ln\bigl\{q \bigl[(2 - \sqrt{3})(\sqrt{3} + \sqrt{2})\bigr]\bigr\} = 2\pi^2$$

The theorem for cubing is also used here:

$q[u(\sqrt{u^4-u^2+1}-u^2+1)]^3 = q[u(\sqrt{u^4-u^2+1}+ u^2-1)]$

From the previously mentioned theorem for cubing, the following equation results for $u = (\sqrt{3} - 1)/\sqrt{2}$:

$$q\bigl[(2 - \sqrt{3})(\sqrt{3} + \sqrt{2})\bigr]^3 = q\bigl[(2 - \sqrt{3})( \sqrt{3} - \sqrt{2})\bigr]$$

The solution to the system of equations with two unknowns then reads as follows:

$$q\bigl[(2 - \sqrt{3})(\sqrt{3} - \sqrt{2})\bigr] = \exp(-\sqrt{6}\,\pi)$$
$$q\bigl[(2 - \sqrt{3})(\sqrt{3} + \sqrt{2})\bigr] = \exp(-\tfrac{1}{3}\sqrt{6 }\,\pi)$$

=== Investigations about incomplete integrals ===
With the incomplete elliptic integrals of the first kind, the values of the elliptic noun function can be derived directly.

With two accurate examples, these direct derivations are to be carried out in the following:

First example:

$F\biggl[2\arctan\biggl(\frac{x^3 + \sqrt{3}\,x}{\sqrt{3}\,x^2 + 1}\biggr);\frac {1}{4}(\sqrt{6} + \sqrt{2})\biggr] = \sqrt{3} \,F\biggl[2\arctan(x);\frac{1}{4}( \sqrt{6} - \sqrt{2})\biggr]$

The correctness of this formula can be proved by computing the differential quotient after the variable $x$ on both sides of the balance of equation.

Using the value $x = 1$ gives this result:

$K\bigl[\frac{1}{4}(\sqrt{6} + \sqrt{2})\bigr] = \sqrt{3} \,K\bigl[\frac{1}{4 }(\sqrt{6} - \sqrt{2})\bigr]$

The following two results emerge:

$q\bigl[\frac{1}{4}(\sqrt{6} - \sqrt{2})\bigr] = \exp\bigl\{- \pi \,K\bigl[\frac{ 1}{4}(\sqrt{6} + \sqrt{2})\bigr]\div K\bigl[\frac{1}{4}(\sqrt{6} - \sqrt{2})\bigr ]\bigr\} = \exp(-\sqrt{3}\,\pi)$

$q\bigl[\frac{1}{4}(\sqrt{6} + \sqrt{2})\bigr] = \exp\bigl\{- \pi \,K\bigl[\frac{ 1}{4}(\sqrt{6} - \sqrt{2})\bigr]\div K\bigl[\frac{1}{4}(\sqrt{6} + \sqrt{2})\bigr ]\bigr\} = \exp\bigl(- \frac{1}{3}\sqrt{3}\,\pi\bigr)$

Second example:

$F\biggl[2\arctan\biggl(\frac{x^5 + 2\sqrt{5}\,\Phi^{-1/2}\,x^3 + \sqrt{5}\,x}{\sqrt{5}\,x^4 + 2\sqrt{5}\,\Phi^{-1/2}\,x^2 + 1}\biggr);\frac{1}{ 2}\sqrt{2}\bigl(\Phi^{-1/2} + \Phi^{-1}\bigr)\biggr] = \sqrt{5} \,F\biggl[2\arctan(x );\frac{1}{2}\sqrt{2}\bigl(\Phi^{-1/2} - \Phi^{-1}\bigr)\biggr]$

The correctness of this formula can be proved by differentiating both sides of the equation balance.

$K\bigl[\frac{1}{2}\sqrt{2}\bigl(\Phi^{-1/2} + \Phi^{-1}\bigr)\bigr] = \sqrt{ 5} \,K\bigl[\frac{1}{2}\sqrt{2}\bigl(\Phi^{-1/2} - \Phi^{-1}\bigr)\bigr]$

The following two results emerge:

$q\bigl[\frac{1}{2}\sqrt{2}\bigl(\Phi^{-1/2} - \Phi^{-1}\bigr)\bigr] = \exp\bigl\{- \pi \,K\bigl[\frac{1}{2}\sqrt{2}\bigl(\Phi^{-1/2} + \Phi^{-1}\bigr)\bigr]\div K\bigl[\frac{1}{2}\sqrt{2}\bigl(\Phi^{-1/2} - \Phi^{-1}\bigr)\bigr]\bigr\} = \exp(- \sqrt{5}\,\pi)$

$q\bigl[\frac{1}{2}\sqrt{2}\bigl(\Phi^{-1/2} + \Phi^{-1}\bigr)\bigr] = \exp\bigl\{- \pi \,K\bigl[\frac{1}{2}\sqrt{2}\bigl(\Phi^{-1/2} - \Phi^{-1}\bigr)\bigr]\div K\bigl[\frac{1}{2}\sqrt{2}\bigl(\Phi^{-1/2} + \Phi^{-1}\bigr)\bigr]\bigr\} = \exp\bigl(-\frac{1}{5}\sqrt{5}\,\pi\bigr)$

Third example:

$F\biggl[2\arctan\biggl(\frac{x^5 + 2\,\sqrt{7}\,x^5 + 7x^3 + \sqrt{7}\,x}{\sqrt{7}\,x^6 + 7x^4 + 2\,\sqrt{7}\,x^2 + 1}\biggr);\frac{1}{8}(3\sqrt{2} + \sqrt{14})\biggr] = \sqrt{7} \,F\biggl[2\arctan(x);\frac{1}{8}(3\sqrt{2} - \sqrt{14}) \biggr]$

The correctness of this formula can be proved by differentiating both sides of the equation balance.

Using the value $x = 1$ gives this result:

$K\bigl[\frac{1}{8}(3\sqrt{2} + \sqrt{14})\bigr] = \sqrt{7} \,K\bigl[\frac{1}{ 8}(3\sqrt{2} - \sqrt{14})\bigr]$

The following two results emerge:

$q\bigl[\frac{1}{8}(3\sqrt{2} - \sqrt{14})\bigr] = \exp\bigl\{- \pi \,K\bigl[\frac {1}{8}(3\sqrt{2} + \sqrt{14})\bigr]\div K\bigl[\frac{1}{8}(3\sqrt{2} - \sqrt{14} )\bigr]\bigr\} = \exp(- \sqrt{7}\,\pi)$

$q\bigl[\frac{1}{8}(3\sqrt{2} + \sqrt{14})\bigr] = \exp\bigl\{- \pi \,K\bigl[\frac {1}{8}(3\sqrt{2} - \sqrt{14})\bigr]\div K\bigl[\frac{1}{8}(3\sqrt{2} + \sqrt{14} )\bigr]\bigr\} = \exp\bigl(- \frac{1}{7}\sqrt{7}\,\pi\bigr)$

== First derivative of the theta function ==
=== Derivation of the derivative ===
The first derivative of the principal theta function among the Jacobi theta functions can be derived in the following way using the chain rule and the derivation formula of the elliptic nome:

$$\frac{\pi^2}{2\varepsilon(1-\varepsilon^2)K(\varepsilon)^2} \,q(\varepsilon)\,\biggl\{\frac{\mathrm{d}}{\mathrm{d}\,q(\varepsilon)}\,\vartheta_{00}\bigl[q(\varepsilon)\bigr]\biggr\} = \biggl[\frac{\mathrm{d}}{\mathrm{d}\varepsilon} \,q(\varepsilon)\biggr]\biggl\{\frac{\mathrm{d}}{\mathrm{d}\,q(\varepsilon)}\,\vartheta_{00}\bigl[q(\varepsilon)\bigr]\biggr\} = \frac{\mathrm{d}}{\mathrm{d}\varepsilon}\,\vartheta_{00}\bigl[q(\varepsilon)\bigr] = \frac{\mathrm{d}}{\mathrm{d}\varepsilon}\,\sqrt{2\pi^{-1}K(\varepsilon)} =$$

$$= \frac{1}{2}\sqrt{2}\,\pi^{-1/2}\,K(\varepsilon)^{-1/2}\biggl[\frac{\mathrm{d}}{\mathrm{d}\varepsilon}\,K(\varepsilon)\biggr] = \frac{1}{2}\sqrt{2}\,\pi^{-1/2}\,K(\varepsilon)^{-1/2}\,\frac{E(\varepsilon) - (1 - \varepsilon^2)K(\varepsilon)}{\varepsilon(1 - \varepsilon^2)}$$

For the now mentioned derivation part this identity is the fundament:

$$\vartheta_{00}[q(\varepsilon)] = \sqrt{2\pi^{-1} K(\varepsilon)}$$

Therefore, this equation results:

$$\frac{\mathrm{d}}{\mathrm{d}\,q(\varepsilon)}\,\vartheta_{00}\bigl[q(\varepsilon)\bigr] = \sqrt{2}\,\pi^{-5/2}\,q(\varepsilon)^{-1}\,K(\varepsilon)^{3/2}\bigl[E(\varepsilon) - (1 - \varepsilon^2)K(\varepsilon)\bigr]$$

The complete elliptic integrals of the second kind have that identity:

$$(1 + \sqrt{1 - \varepsilon^2})\,E\left(\frac{1 - \sqrt{1 - \varepsilon^2}}{1 + \sqrt{1 - \varepsilon^2}}\right) = E(\varepsilon) + \sqrt{1 - \varepsilon^2}\,K(\varepsilon)$$

Along with this modular identity, following formula transformation can be made:

$$\frac{\mathrm{d}}{\mathrm{d}\,q(\varepsilon)}\,\vartheta_{00}\bigl[q(\varepsilon)\bigr] = \sqrt{2}\,\pi^{-5/2}\,q(\varepsilon)^{-1}\,K(\varepsilon)^{3/2}(1 + \sqrt{1 - \varepsilon^2})\left[E\left(\frac{1 - \sqrt{1 - \varepsilon^2}}{1 + \sqrt{1 - \varepsilon^2}}\right) - \sqrt{1 - \varepsilon^2}\,K(\varepsilon)\right]$$

Furthermore, this identity is valid:

$$\vartheta_{01}[q(\varepsilon)] = \sqrt[4]{1 - \varepsilon^2}\sqrt{2\pi^{-1} K(\varepsilon)}$$

By using the theta function expressions ϑ_{00}(x) and ϑ_{01}(x) following representation is possible:

$$\frac{\mathrm{d}}{\mathrm{d}\,q(\varepsilon)}\,\vartheta_{00}\bigl[q(\varepsilon)\bigr] = \frac{1}{2\pi}\,q(\varepsilon)^{-1}\vartheta_{00}[q(\varepsilon)]\bigl\{\vartheta_{00}[q(\varepsilon)]^2 + \vartheta_{01}[q(\varepsilon)]^2\bigr\}\biggl\langle E\biggl\{\frac{\vartheta_{00}[q(\varepsilon)]^2 - \vartheta_{01}[q(\varepsilon)]^2}{\vartheta_{00}[q(\varepsilon)]^2 + \vartheta_{01}[q(\varepsilon)]^2}\biggr\} - \frac{\pi}{2}\,\vartheta_{01}\bigl[q(\varepsilon)\bigr]^2\biggr\rangle$$

This is the final result:

$$\frac{\mathrm{d}}{\mathrm{d}x} \,\vartheta_{00}(x) = \vartheta_{00}(x)\bigl[\vartheta_{00}(x)^2+\vartheta_{01}(x)^2\bigr]\biggl\{\frac{1}{2\pi x}E\biggl[\frac{\vartheta_{00}(x)^2-\vartheta_{01}(x)^2}{\vartheta_{00}(x)^2+\vartheta_{01}(x)^2}\biggr] - \frac{\vartheta_{01}(x)^2}{4x}\biggr\}$$

=== Related first derivatives ===
In a similar way following other first derivatives of theta functions and their combinations can also be derived:

$$\frac{\mathrm{d}}{\mathrm{d}x} \,\vartheta_{01}(x) = \vartheta_{01}(x)\bigl[\vartheta_{00}(x)^2+\vartheta_{01}(x)^2\bigr]\biggl\{\frac{1}{2\pi x}E\biggl[\frac{\vartheta_{00}(x)^2-\vartheta_{01}(x)^2}{\vartheta_{00}(x)^2+\vartheta_{01}(x)^2}\biggr] - \frac{\vartheta_{00}(x)^2}{4x}\biggr\}$$
$$\frac{\mathrm{d}}{\mathrm{d}x} \,\vartheta_{10}(x) = \frac{1}{2\pi x} \vartheta_{10}(x)\vartheta_{00}(x)^2 E\biggl[\frac{\vartheta_{10}(x)^2}{\vartheta_{00}(x)^2}\biggr]$$
$$\frac{\mathrm{d}}{\mathrm{d}x} \,\frac{\vartheta_{00}(x)}{\vartheta_{01}(x)} = \frac{\vartheta_{00}(x)^5 - \vartheta_{00}(x)\vartheta_{01}(x)^4}{4x\,\vartheta_{01}(x)}$$
$$\frac{\mathrm{d}}{\mathrm{d}x} \,\frac{\vartheta_{10}(x)}{\vartheta_{00}(x)} = \frac{\vartheta_{10}(x)\vartheta_{01}(x)^4}{4x\,\vartheta_{00}(x)}$$
$$\frac{\mathrm{d}}{\mathrm{d}x} \,\frac{\vartheta_{10}(x)}{\vartheta_{01}(x)} = \frac{\vartheta_{10}(x)\vartheta_{00}(x)^4}{4x\,\vartheta_{01}(x)}$$

Important definition:

$$\vartheta_{10}(x) = 2x^{1/4} + 2x^{1/4}\sum_{n = 1}^{\infty} x^{2\bigtriangleup(n)}$$
$$\bigtriangleup\!(n) = \tfrac{1}{2}n(n + 1)$$
