= Julien-Léopold Boilly =

French artist (1796–1874)

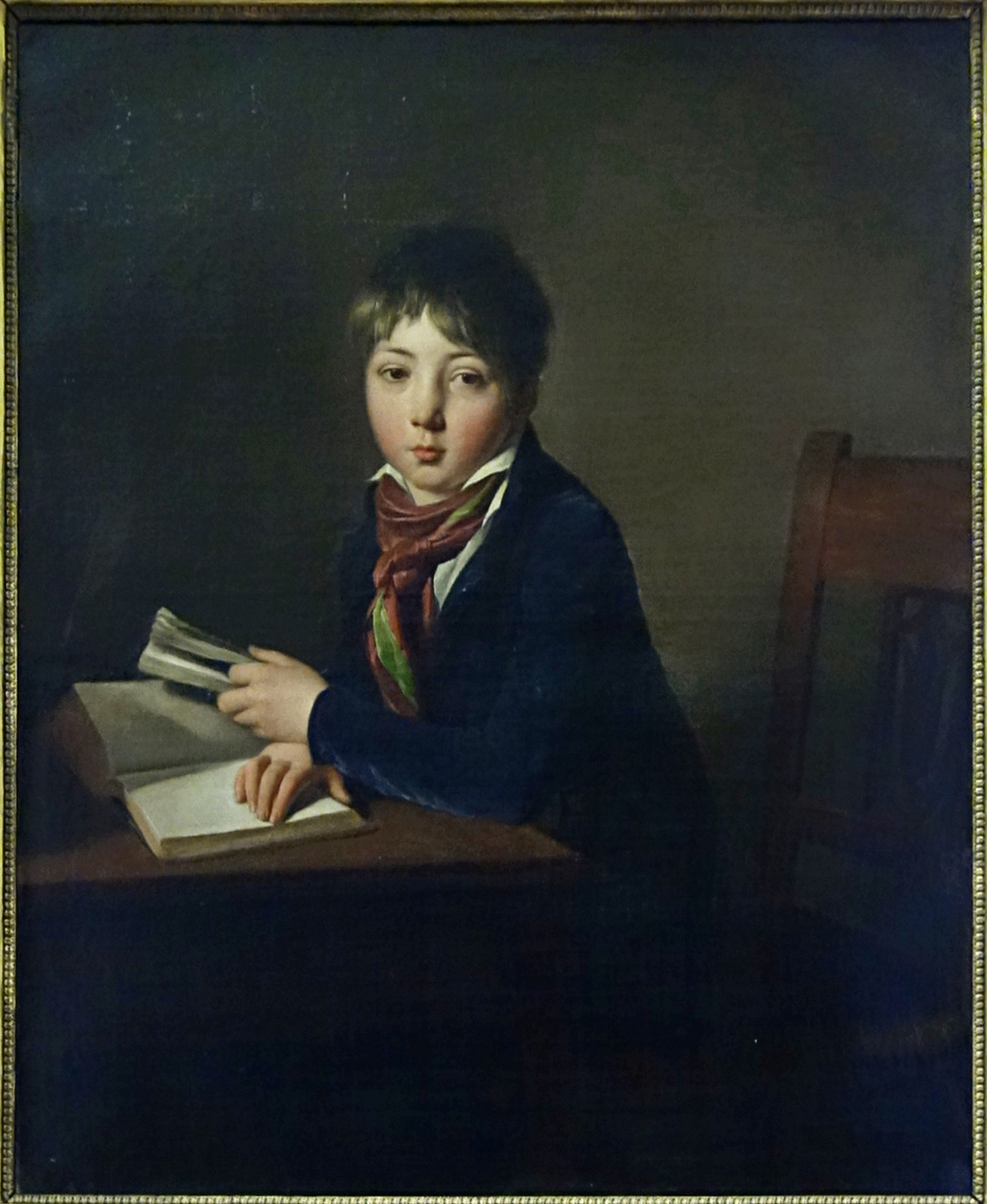
Portrait of Boilly painted by his father Louis-Léopold, c. 1808

Julien-Léopold Boilly (French pronunciation: [ʒyljɛ̃ leɔpɔl(d) bwɑji]; 30 August 1796 – 14 June 1874), also known as Jules Boilly, was a French artist noted for his album of lithographs Iconographie de l'Institut Royal de France (1820–1821) and his booklet Album de 73 portraits-charge aquarellés des membres de l'Institut (1820) containing watercolor caricatures of seventy-three famous mathematicians, in particular the French mathematician Adrien-Marie Legendre, the only known portrait of him.

== Life ==
Born in Paris on 30 August 1796, he was a son of the genial painter-engraver Louis-Léopold Boilly. Admitted to the lycée at Versailles 15 December 1806, he painted portraits and illustrated books with lithographs. He also collected autographs. He died on 14 June 1874.

== Selected works ==
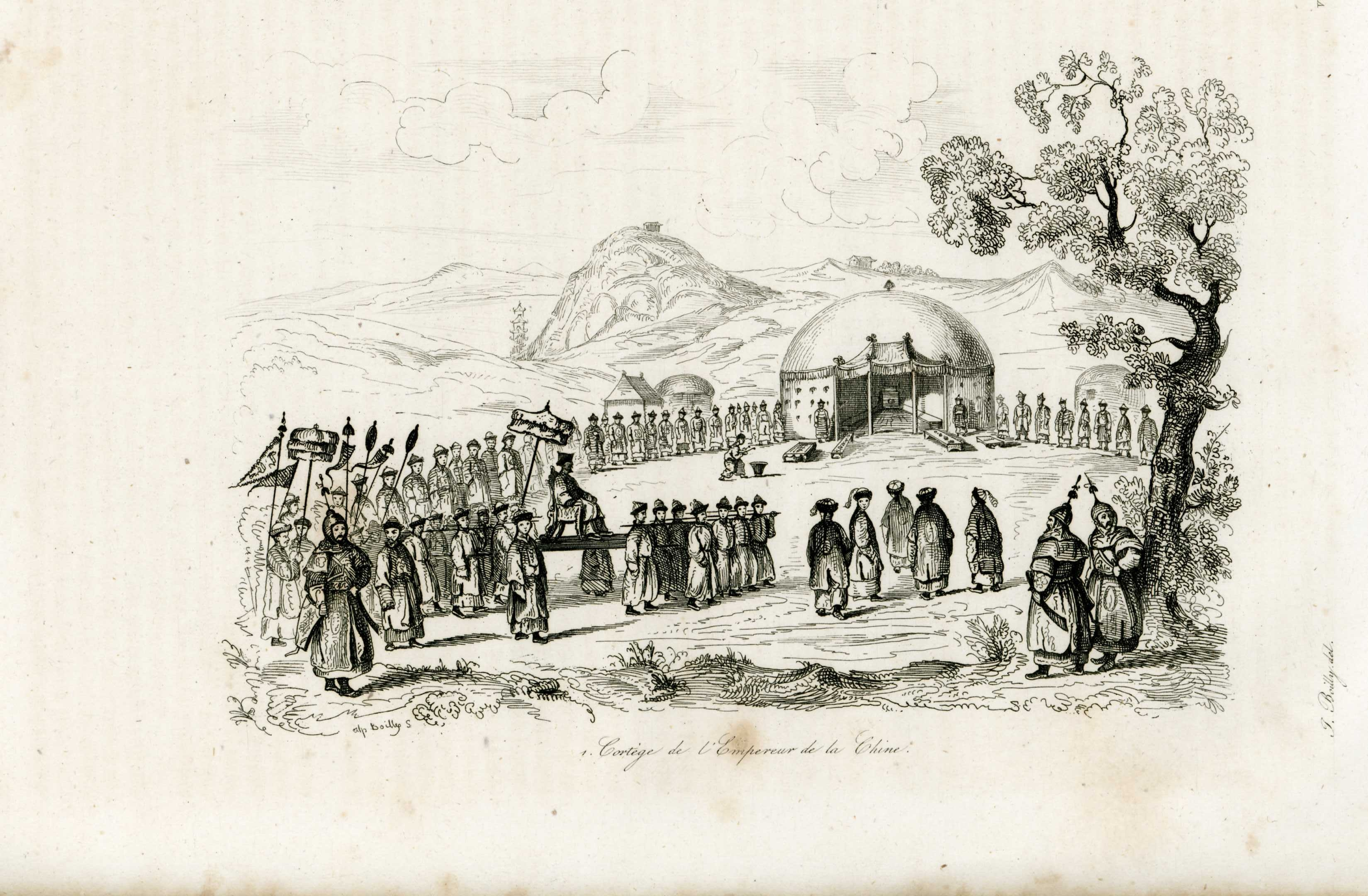
Cortège de l'empereur de Chine

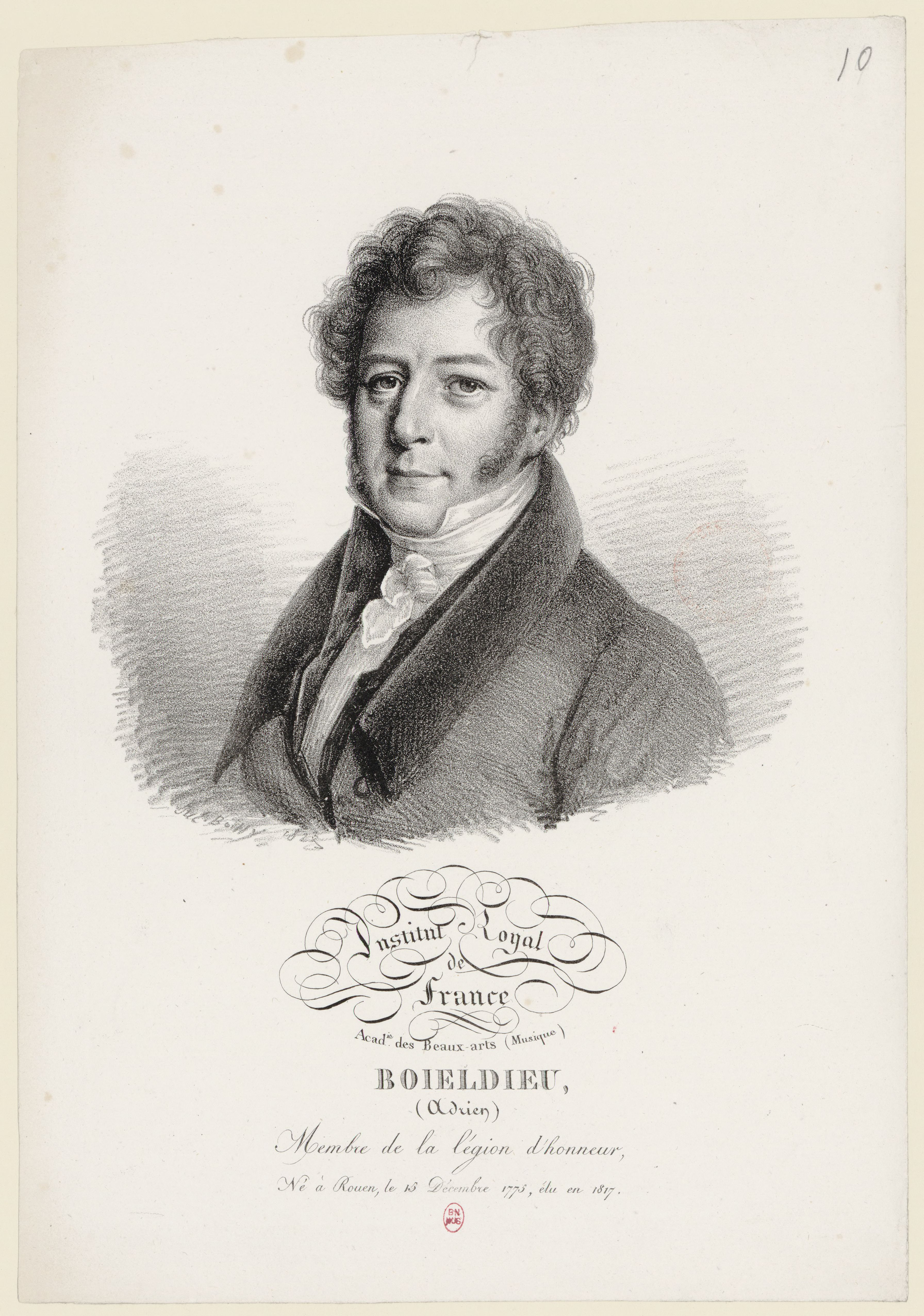
François-Adrien Boieldieu 1825

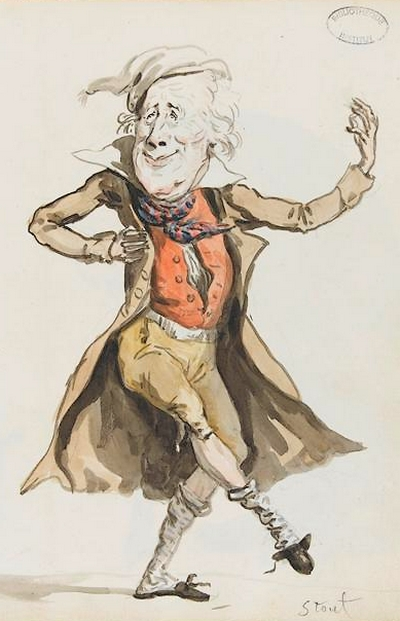
Jean-Baptiste Stouf

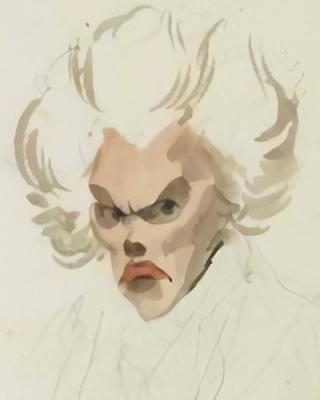
His caricatural depiction of Adrien-Marie Legendre

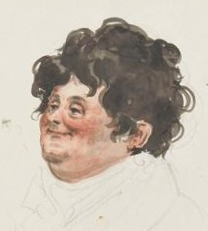
His caricatural depiction of Joseph Fourier
