= Legendre's relation =

In mathematics, Legendre's relation can be expressed in either of two forms: as a relation between complete elliptic integrals, or as a relation between periods and quasiperiods of elliptic functions. The two forms are equivalent as the periods and quasiperiods can be expressed in terms of complete elliptic integrals. It was introduced (for complete elliptic integrals) by A. M. Legendre (1811, 1825, p. 61).

== Complete elliptic integrals ==
Legendre's relation stated using complete elliptic integrals is

$$K'E + KE' - KK' = \frac \pi 2$$

where K and K′ are the complete elliptic integrals of the first kind for values satisfying k^{2} + k′^{2} = 1, and E and E′ are the complete elliptic integrals of the second kind.

This form of Legendre's relation expresses the fact that the Wronskian of the complete elliptic integrals (considered as solutions of a differential equation) is a constant.

== Elliptic functions ==
Legendre's relation stated using elliptic functions is

$$\omega_2 \eta_1 - \omega_1 \eta_2 = 2\pi i \,$$

where ω_{1} and ω_{2} are the periods of the Weierstrass elliptic function, and η_{1} and η_{2} are the quasiperiods of the Weierstrass zeta function. Some authors normalize these in a different way differing by factors of 2, in which case the right hand side of the Legendre relation is πi or πi / 2. This relation can be proved by integrating the Weierstrass zeta function about the boundary of a fundamental region and applying Cauchy's residue theorem.

== Proof ==
=== Proof of the lemniscatic case ===
The lemniscatic arc sine and the complementary lemniscatic arcsine are defined as follows:

$$\operatorname{arcsl}(r) = \int_{0}^{r} \frac{1}{\sqrt{1-\rho^4}} \,\mathrm{d}\rho = \frac{1}{2}\sqrt{2} \,K\bigl(\tfrac{1}{2}\sqrt{2}\bigr) - \frac{1}{2}\sqrt{2} \,E\bigl[\arccos(r);\tfrac{1}{2}\sqrt{2}\bigr]$$
$$\operatorname{arcsl}^{*}(r) = \int_{0}^{r} \frac{1+\rho^2}{\sqrt{1-\rho^4}} \,\mathrm{d}\rho = \sqrt{2} \,E\bigl(\tfrac{1}{2}\sqrt{2}\bigr) - \sqrt{2} \,E\bigl[\arccos(r);\tfrac{1}{2}\sqrt{2}\bigr]$$

And these derivatives are valid:

$$\frac{\mathrm{d}}{\mathrm{d}r} \operatorname{arcsl}(r) = \frac{1}{\sqrt{1-r^4}}$$
$$\frac{\mathrm{d}}{\mathrm{d}r} \operatorname{arcsl}^{*}(r) = \frac{1+r^2}{\sqrt{1-r^4}} = \biggl(\frac{1+r^2}{1-r^2}\biggr)^{1/2}$$

The lemniscatic case for the Legendre Identity can be shown in this way:

Following formula is given, that uses the lemniscatic arc functions as antiderivatives:

$$\frac{1}{\sqrt{1 - x^4}}\operatorname{arcsl}^{*}(x) - \frac{1 - x^2}{\sqrt{1 - x^4}}\operatorname{arcsl}(x) = \int_{0}^{1} \frac{x^3(y^2+1)}{\sqrt{(1-x^4)(1-x^4 y^4)}} \,\mathrm{d}y$$

By constructing the original antiderivative in relation to x, this formula appears:

$$\operatorname{arcsl}(x)\bigl[\operatorname{arcsl}^{*}(x) - \operatorname{arcsl}(x)\bigr] = \int_{0}^{1} \frac{y^2 + 1}{2\,y^2}\biggl[\operatorname{artanh}(y^2) - \operatorname{artanh}\bigl(\frac{\sqrt{1 - x^4}\,y^2}{\sqrt{1 - x^4 y^4}}\bigr)\biggr] \mathrm{d}y$$

By putting the value $x = 1$ into that formula, following result is generated:

$$\operatorname{arcsl}(1)\bigl[\operatorname{arcsl}^{*}(1) - \operatorname{arcsl}(1)\bigr] = \int_{0}^{1} \frac{y^2 + 1}{2\,y^2}\operatorname{artanh}(y^2) \,\mathrm{d}y = \frac{\pi}{4}$$

Because of the identities of the functions K, F and E, this formula can be directly deduced from that result:

$$K\bigl(\frac{1}{2}\sqrt{2}\bigr) \bigl[2 E\bigl(\frac{1}{2}\sqrt{2}\bigr) - K\bigl(\frac{1}{2}\sqrt{2}\bigr)\bigr] = \frac{\pi}{2}$$

=== Proof of the general case ===
According to the derivation just carried out, the above result is valid and displayed here in a summandized way:

$$2 E\bigl(\frac{1}{2}\sqrt{2}\bigr)K\bigl(\frac{1}{2}\sqrt{2}\bigr) - K\bigl(\frac{1}{2}\sqrt{2}\bigr)^2 = \frac{\pi}{2}$$

Now the modular general case is to be proved in the following. For this purpose, the derivatives of the complete elliptic integrals are derived. And then the derivation of Legendre's identity balance is determined.

Proof of the derivative of the elliptic integral of the first kind:

$$\frac{\mathrm{d}}{\mathrm{d}\varepsilon} K(\varepsilon) = \frac{\mathrm{d}}{\mathrm{d}\varepsilon} \int_{0}^{1} \frac{1}{\sqrt{(1-x^2)(1-\varepsilon^2 x^2)}} \mathrm{d}x = \int_{0}^{1} \frac{\mathrm{d}}{\mathrm{d}\varepsilon} \frac{1}{\sqrt{(1-x^2)(1-\varepsilon^2 x^2)}} \mathrm{d}x = \int_{0}^{1} \frac{\varepsilon x^2}{\sqrt{(1-x^2)(1-\varepsilon^2 x^2)^3}} \mathrm{d}x =$$
$$= \int_{0}^{1} \frac{\sqrt{1-\varepsilon^2 x^2}}{\varepsilon(1-\varepsilon^2)\sqrt{(1-x^2)}} \mathrm{d}x - \int_{0}^{1} \frac{1}{\varepsilon\sqrt{(1-x^2)(1-\varepsilon^2 x^2)}} \mathrm{d}x - \int_{0}^{1} \frac{\varepsilon(1-2x^2+\varepsilon^2 x^4)}{(1-\varepsilon^2)\sqrt{(1-x^2)(1-\varepsilon^2 x^2)^3}} \mathrm{d}x =$$
$$= \frac{1}{\varepsilon(1-\varepsilon^2)}E(\varepsilon) - \frac{1}{\varepsilon}K(\varepsilon) - \int_{0}^{1} \frac{\mathrm{d}}{\mathrm{d}x} \frac{\varepsilon x\sqrt{1-x^2}}{(1-\varepsilon^2)\sqrt{1-\varepsilon^2 x^2}} \mathrm{d}x = \frac{1}{\varepsilon(1-\varepsilon^2)} \bigl[E(\varepsilon) - (1-\varepsilon^2)K(\varepsilon)\bigr]$$

Proof of the derivative of the elliptic integral of the second kind:

$$\frac{\mathrm{d}}{\mathrm{d}\varepsilon} E(\varepsilon) = \frac{\mathrm{d}}{\mathrm{d}\varepsilon} \int_{0}^{1} \frac{\sqrt{1-\varepsilon^2 x^2}}{\sqrt{1-x^2}} \mathrm{d}x = \int_{0}^{1} \frac{\mathrm{d}}{\mathrm{d}\varepsilon} \frac{\sqrt{1-\varepsilon^2 x^2}}{\sqrt{1-x^2}} \mathrm{d}x = \int_{0}^{1} \frac{-\varepsilon x^2}{\sqrt{(1-x^2)(1-\varepsilon^2 x^2)}} \mathrm{d}x =$$
$$= - \int_{0}^{1} \frac{1}{\varepsilon\sqrt{(1-x^2)(1-\varepsilon^2 x^2)}} \mathrm{d}x + \int_{0}^{1} \frac{\sqrt{1-\varepsilon^2 x^2}}{\varepsilon\sqrt{(1-x^2)}} \mathrm{d}x = - \frac{1}{\varepsilon}\bigl[K(\varepsilon) - E(\varepsilon)\bigr]$$

For the Pythagorean counter-modules and according to the chain rule this relation is valid:

$$\frac{\mathrm{d}}{\mathrm{d}\varepsilon}K(\sqrt{1 - \varepsilon^2}) = \frac{1}{\varepsilon(1-\varepsilon^2)} \bigl[\varepsilon^2 K(\sqrt{1 - \varepsilon^2}) - E(\sqrt{1 - \varepsilon^2})\bigr]$$
$$\frac{\mathrm{d}}{\mathrm{d}\varepsilon}E(\sqrt{1 - \varepsilon^2}) = \frac{\varepsilon}{1 - \varepsilon^2} \bigl[K(\sqrt{1 - \varepsilon^2}) - E(\sqrt{1 - \varepsilon^2})\bigr]$$

Because the derivative of the circle function is the negative product of the so called identical function and the reciprocal of the circle function. The Legendre's relation always includes products of two complete elliptic integrals. For the derivation of the function side from the equation scale of Legendre's identity, the product rule is now applied in the following:

$$\frac{\mathrm{d}}{\mathrm{d}\varepsilon}K(\varepsilon)E(\sqrt{1 - \varepsilon^2}) = \frac{1}{\varepsilon(1-\varepsilon^2)} \bigl[E(\varepsilon)E(\sqrt{1 - \varepsilon^2}) - K(\varepsilon)E(\sqrt{1 - \varepsilon^2}) + \varepsilon^2 K(\varepsilon)K(\sqrt{1 - \varepsilon^2})\bigr]$$
$$\frac{\mathrm{d}}{\mathrm{d}\varepsilon}E(\varepsilon)K(\sqrt{1 - \varepsilon^2}) = \frac{1}{\varepsilon(1-\varepsilon^2)} \bigl[- E(\varepsilon)E(\sqrt{1 - \varepsilon^2}) + E(\varepsilon)K(\sqrt{1 - \varepsilon^2}) - (1 - \varepsilon^2) K(\varepsilon)K(\sqrt{1 - \varepsilon^2})\bigr]$$
$$\frac{\mathrm{d}}{\mathrm{d}\varepsilon}K(\varepsilon)K(\sqrt{1 - \varepsilon^2}) = \frac{1}{\varepsilon(1-\varepsilon^2)} \bigl[E(\varepsilon)K(\sqrt{1 - \varepsilon^2}) - K(\varepsilon)E(\sqrt{1 - \varepsilon^2}) - (1 - 2\varepsilon^2) K(\varepsilon)K(\sqrt{1 - \varepsilon^2})\bigr]$$

Of these three equations, adding the top two equations and subtracting the bottom equation gives this result:

$$\frac{\mathrm{d}}{\mathrm{d}\varepsilon} \bigl[K(\varepsilon)E(\sqrt{1 - \varepsilon^2}) + E(\varepsilon)K(\sqrt{1 - \varepsilon^2}) - K(\varepsilon)K(\sqrt{1 - \varepsilon^2})\bigr] = 0$$

In relation to ε, the balance constantly gives the value zero.

The previously determined result applies to the module $\varepsilon = 1/\sqrt{2}$ in this way:

$$2E\bigl(\frac{1}{2}\sqrt{2}\bigr)K\bigl(\frac{1}{2}\sqrt{2}\bigr) - K\bigl(\frac{1}{2}\sqrt{2}\bigr)^2 = \frac{\pi}{2}$$

The combination of the last two formulas gives the following result:

$$K(\varepsilon)E(\sqrt{1 - \varepsilon^2}) + E(\varepsilon)K(\sqrt{1 - \varepsilon^2}) - K(\varepsilon)K(\sqrt{1 - \varepsilon^2}) = \frac{\pi}{2}$$

Because if the derivative of a continuous function constantly takes the value zero, then the concerned function is a constant function. This means that this function results in the same function value for each abscissa value ε and the associated function graph is therefore a horizontal straight line.
