= Jacques Legendre =

Jacques Legendre may refer to:

- Jacques Legendre (Canadian politician), Canadian former Ottawa politician
- Jacques Legendre (French politician) (born 1941), French politician and member of the Senate of France
