= Legendre moment =

In mathematics, Legendre moments are a type of image moment and are achieved by using the Legendre polynomial. Legendre moments are used in areas of image processing including: pattern and object recognition, image indexing, line fitting, feature extraction, edge detection, and texture analysis. Legendre moments have been studied as a means to reduce image moment calculation complexity by limiting the amount of information redundancy through approximation.

== Legendre moments ==
With order of m + n, and object intensity function f(x,y):

$$L_{mn}=\frac{(2m+1)(2n+1)} 4 \int\limits_{-1}^1 \int\limits_{-1}^1 P_m(x) P_n(y)f(x,y) \,dx\, dy$$

where m,n = 1, 2, 3, ...∞ with the nth-order Legendre polynomials being:

$$P_n(x)=\sum_{k=0}^n a_{k,n}x^k=\frac{(-1)^n}{2^n n!} \left( \frac{d}{dx} \right) [(1-x^2)^n]$$

which can also be written:

$$\begin{align}
P_n(x) & =\sum_{k=0}^{D(n)}(-1)^k \frac{(2n-2k)!}{2^n k!(n-k)!(n-2k)!} x^{n-2k} \\[5pt]
&  = \frac{(2n)!}{2^n(n!)^2}x^n-\frac{(2n-2)!}{2^n 1!(n-1)!(n-2)!} x^{n-2} + \cdots
\end{align}$$

where D(n) = floor(n/2). The set of Legendre polynomials {P_{n}(x)} form an orthogonal set on the interval [−1,1]:

$$\int_{-1}^1 P_n(x)P_m(x) \, dx = \frac{2}{2n+1}\delta_{nm}$$

A recurrence relation can be used to compute the Legendre polynomial:

$$(n+1)P_{n+1}(x)-(2n+1)xP_n(x)+nP_{n-1}(x)=0$$

f(x,y) can be written as an infinite series expansion in terms of Legendre polynomials [−1 ≤ x,y ≤ 1.]:

$$f(x,y)=\sum_{m=0}^\infty \sum_{n=0}^\infty \lambda_{mn}P_m(x)P_n(y)$$

== See also ==
- Image moment
- Legendre polynomial
- Zernike polynomials
