= Adrien-Marie Legendre =

French mathematician (1752–1833)

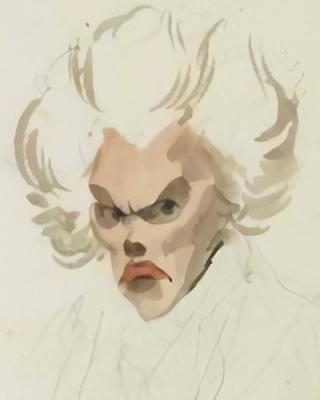
- Watercolor caricature by Julien-Léopold Boilly (see § Mistaken portrait), the only authenticated portrait of Legendre
- Born: 18 September 1752; Paris, France
- Died: 9 January 1833 (aged 80); Paris, France
- Education: Collège Mazarin
- Known for: Associated Legendre polynomials Legendre transformation Legendre polynomials Elliptic functions Introducing the character ∂
- Scientific career
- Fields: Mathematician
- Workplaces: École Militaire; École Normale; École Polytechnique

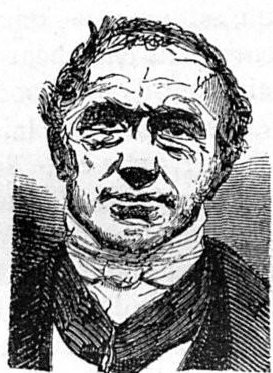
Portrait based on an anonymous and undated sketch, allegedly given by Legendre to François Arago in 1829, according to Arago's son.

Coat of Arms of Adrien-Marie Legendre, as he was knighted in 1811

Adrien-Marie Legendre (/ləˈʒɑːndər, -ˈʒɑːnd/; French: [adʁiɛ̃ maʁi ləʒɑ̃dʁ]; 18 September 1752 – 9 January 1833) was a French mathematician who made numerous contributions to mathematics. Well-known and important concepts such as the Legendre polynomials and Legendre transformation are named after him. He is also known for his contributions to the method of least squares, and was the first to officially publish on it, though Carl Friedrich Gauss had discovered it before him.

== Life ==
Adrien-Marie Legendre was born in Paris on 18 September 1752 to a wealthy family. He received his education at the Collège Mazarin in Paris, and defended his thesis in physics and mathematics in 1770. He taught at the École Militaire in Paris from 1775 to 1780 and at the École Normale from 1795. At the same time, he was associated with the Bureau des Longitudes. In 1782, the Berlin Academy awarded Legendre a prize for his treatise on projectiles in resistant media. This treatise also brought him to the attention of Lagrange.

The Académie des sciences made Legendre an adjoint member in 1783 and an associate in 1785. In 1789, he was elected a Fellow of the Royal Society.

He assisted with the Anglo-French Survey (1784–1790) to calculate the precise distance between the Paris Observatory and the Royal Greenwich Observatory by means of trigonometry. To this end in 1787 he visited Dover and London together with Dominique, comte de Cassini and Pierre Méchain. The three also visited William Herschel, the discoverer of the planet Uranus.

Legendre lost his private fortune in 1793 during the French Revolution. That year, he also married Marguerite-Claudine Couhin, who helped him put his affairs in order. In 1795, Legendre became one of six members of the mathematics section of the reconstituted Académie des Sciences, renamed the Institut National des Sciences et des Arts. Later, in 1803, Napoleon reorganized the Institut National, and Legendre became a member of the Geometry section. From 1799 to 1812, Legendre served as mathematics examiner for graduating artillery students at the École Militaire and from 1799 to 1815 he served as permanent mathematics examiner for the École Polytechnique. In 1824, Legendre's pension from the École Militaire was stopped because he refused to vote for the government candidate at the Institut National. In 1831, he was made an officer of the Légion d'Honneur.

Legendre died in Paris on 9 January 1833, after a long and painful illness, and Legendre's widow carefully preserved his belongings to memorialize him. Upon her death in 1856, she was buried next to her husband in the village of Auteuil, where the couple had lived, and left their last country house to the village. Legendre's name is one of the 72 names inscribed on the Eiffel Tower.

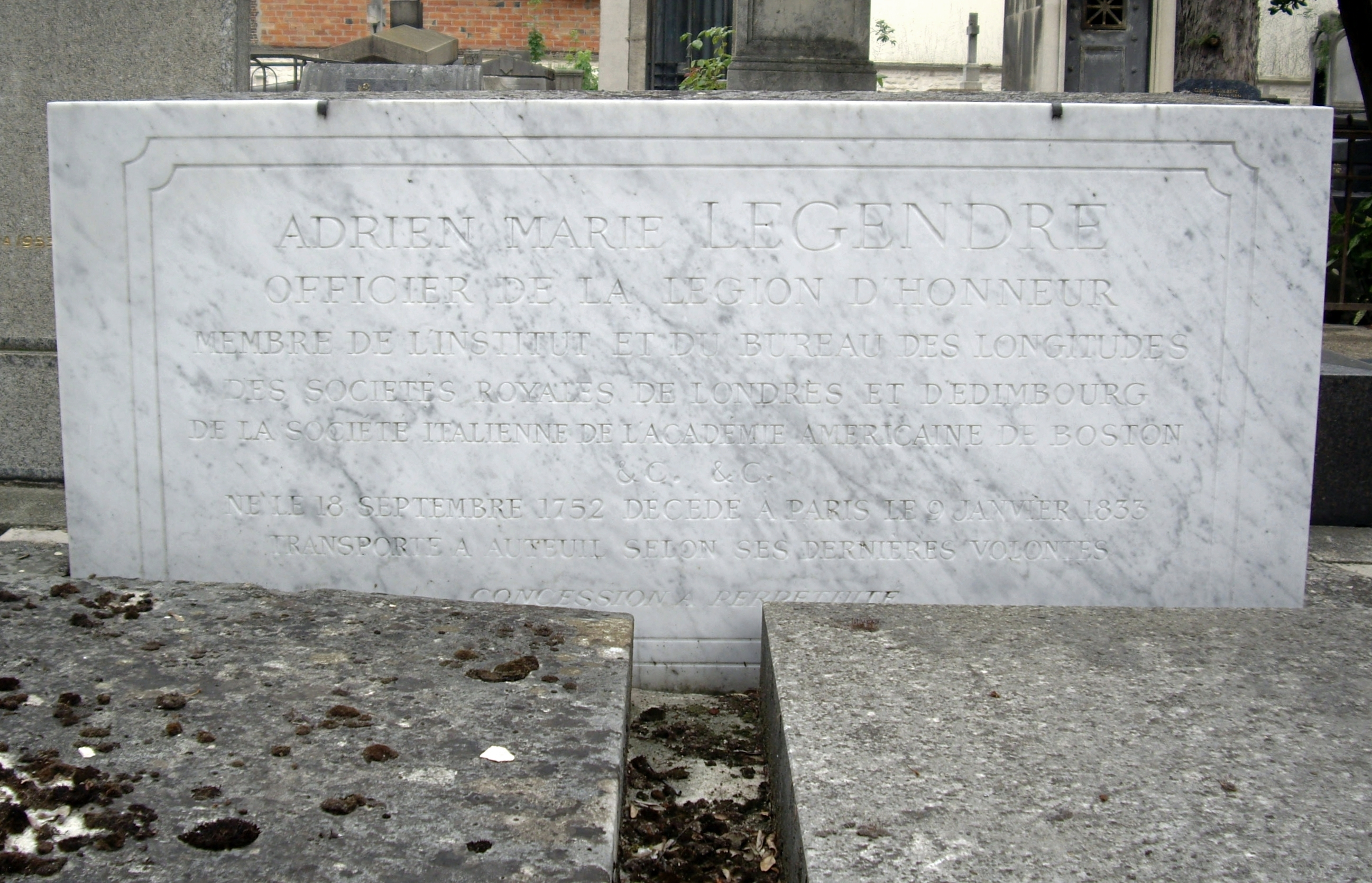
Legendre's grave at the Auteuil cemetery

== Mathematical work ==
Abel's work on elliptic functions was built on Legendre's, and some of Gauss's work in statistics and number theory completed that of Legendre. He developed, and first communicated to his contemporaries before Gauss, the least squares method which has broad application in linear regression, signal processing, statistics, and curve fitting; this was published in 1806 as an appendix to his book on the paths of comets. Today, the term "least squares method" is used as a direct translation from the French "méthode des moindres carrés".

His major work is Exercices de Calcul Intégral, published in three volumes in 1811, 1817 and 1819. In the first volume he introduced the basic properties of elliptic integrals, beta functions and gamma functions, introducing the symbol Γ and normalizing it to Γ(n+1) = n!. Further results on the beta and gamma functions along with their applications to mechanics – such as the rotation of the earth, and the attraction of ellipsoids – appeared in the second volume. In 1830, he gave a proof of Fermat's Last Theorem for exponent n = 5, which was also proven by Lejeune Dirichlet in 1828.

In number theory, he conjectured the quadratic reciprocity law, subsequently proved by Gauss; in connection to this, the Legendre symbol is named after him. He also did pioneering work on the distribution of primes, and on the application of analysis to number theory. His 1798 conjecture of the prime number theorem was rigorously proved by Hadamard and de la Vallée-Poussin in 1896.

Legendre did an impressive amount of work on elliptic functions, including the classification of elliptic integrals, but it took Abel's study of the inverses of Jacobi's functions to solve the problem completely.

He is known for the Legendre transformation, which is used to go from the Lagrangian to the Hamiltonian formulation of classical mechanics. In thermodynamics it is also used to obtain the enthalpy and the Helmholtz and Gibbs (free) energies from the internal energy. He is also the namesake of the Legendre polynomials, solutions to Legendre's differential equation, which occur frequently in physics and engineering applications, such as electrostatics.

Legendre is best known as the author of Éléments de géométrie, which was published in 1794 and was the leading elementary text on the topic for around 100 years. This text greatly rearranged and simplified many of the propositions from Euclid's Elements to create a more effective textbook.

== Honors ==
- Foreign Honorary Member of the American Academy of Arts and Sciences (1832)
- The Moon crater Legendre is named after him.
- Main-belt asteroid 26950 Legendre is named after him.
- Legendre is one of the 72 prominent French scientists who were commemorated on plaques at the first stage of the Eiffel Tower when it first opened.
- A street in Paris' 17th Arrondissement is named after him.

== Publications ==
Essays

- 1782 Recherches sur la trajectoire des projectiles dans les milieux résistants (prize on projectiles offered by the Berlin Academy)

Books

- Eléments de géométrie, textbook 1794
- Essai sur la Théorie des Nombres 1797-8 ("An VI"), 2nd ed. 1808, 3rd ed. in 2 vol. 1830
- Nouvelles Méthodes pour la Détermination des Orbites des Comètes, 1805
- Exercices de Calcul Intégral, book in three volumes 1811, 1817, and 1819
- Traité des Fonctions Elliptiques, book in three volumes 1825, 1826, and 1830

Memoires in Histoire de l'Académie Royale des Sciences

- 1783 Sur l'attraction des Sphéroïdes homogènes (work on Legendre polynomials)
- 1784 Recherches sur la figure des Planètes p. 370
- 1785 Recherches d'analyse indéterminée p. 465 (work on number theory)
- 1786 Mémoire sur la manière de distinguer les Maxima des Minima dans le Calcul des Variations p. 7 (as Legendre)
- 1786 Mémoire sur les Intégrations par arcs d'ellipse p. 616 (as le Gendre)
- 1786 Second Mémoire sur les Intégrations par arcs d'ellipse p. 644
- 1787 L'intégration de quelques équations aux différences Partielles (Legendre transform)

In Memoires présentés par divers Savants à la l'Académie des Sciences de l'Institut de France

- 1806 Nouvelle formula pour réduire en distances vraies les distances apparentes de la Lune au Soleil ou à une étoile (30–54)
- 1807 Analyse des triangles tracés sur la surface d'un sphéroide (130–161)
- Tome 10 Recherches sur diverses sortes d'intégrales défines (416–509)
- 1819 Méthode des moindres carrés pour trouver le milieu le plus probable entre les résultats de différentes observations (149–154), Mémoire sur l'attraction des ellipsoïdes homogènes (155–183)
- 1823 Recherches sur quelques objets d'Analyse indéterminée et particulièrement sur le théorème de Fermat (1–60)
- 1828 Mémoire sur la détermination des fonctions Y et Z que satisfont à l'équation 4(X^n-1) = (X-1)(Y^2+-nZ^2), n étant un nombre premier 4i-+1 (81–100)
- 1833 Réflexions sur différentes manières de démontrer la théorie des parallèles ou le théorème sur la somme des trois angles du triangle, avec 1 planche (367–412)

== Mistaken portrait ==
For two centuries, until the discovery of the error in 2005, books, paintings and articles had incorrectly shown a profile portrait of the obscure French politician Louis Legendre (1752–1797) as a portrait of the mathematician. The error arose from the fact that the sketch was labelled simply "Legendre" and appeared in a book along with contemporary mathematicians such as Lagrange. One of only two known portraits of Legendre, rediscovered in 2008, is found in the 1820 book Album de 73 portraits-charge aquarellés des membres de I'Institut, a book of caricatures of seventy-three members of the Institut de France in Paris by the French artist Julien-Léopold Boilly as shown below. The other portrait is from the book Le Panthéon scientifique de la tour Eiffel.

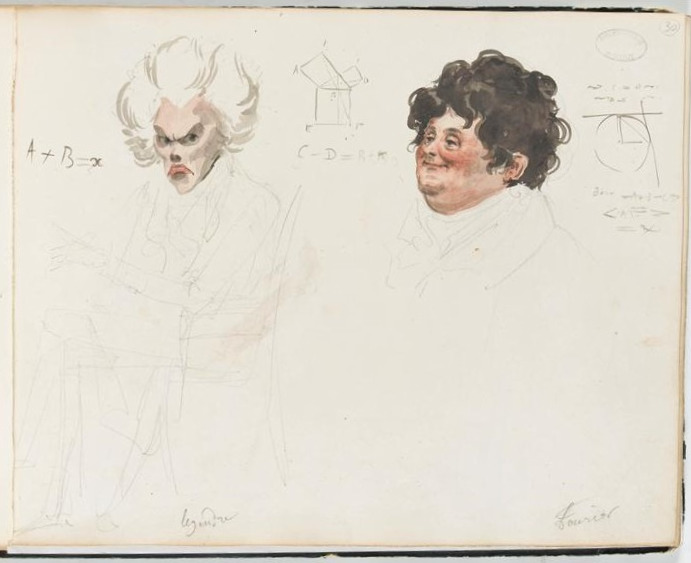
1820 watercolor caricatures of the French mathematicians Adrien-Marie Legendre (left) and Joseph Fourier (right) by French artist Julien-Léopold Boilly, watercolor portrait numbers 29 and 30 of Album de 73 portraits-charge aquarellés des membres de I'Institut.

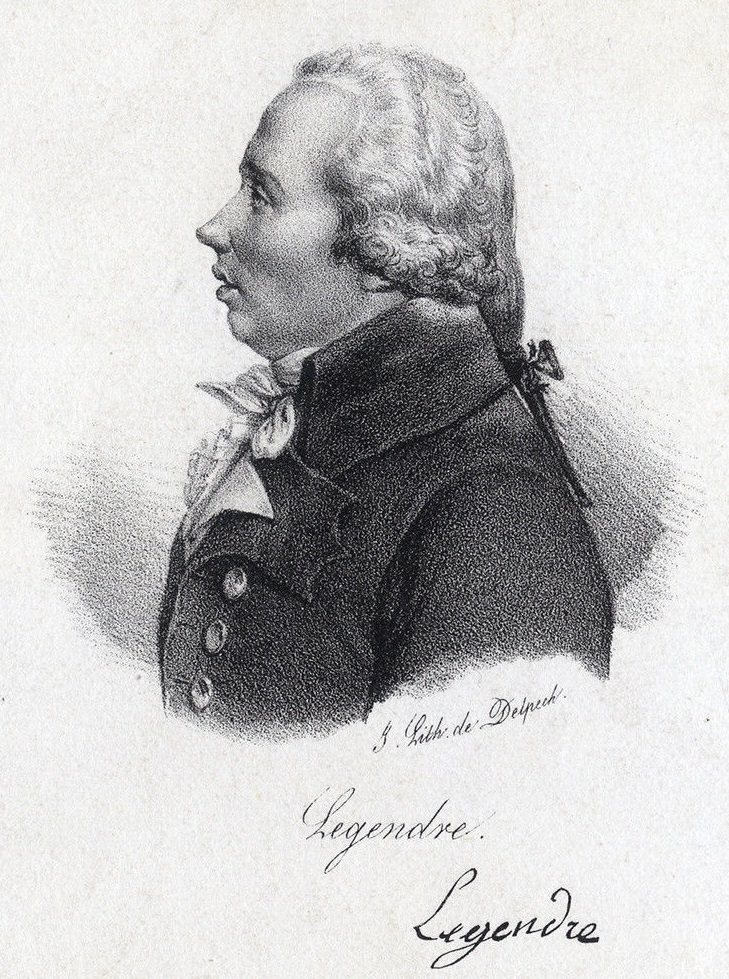
Side view sketching of French politician Louis Legendre (1752–1797), whose portrait had been mistakenly used, for nearly 200 years, to represent French mathematician Adrien-Marie Legendre, i.e. up until 2005 when the mistake was discovered.

== See also ==
- List of things named after Adrien-Marie Legendre
- Associated Legendre polynomials
- Gauss–Legendre algorithm
- Legendre's constant
- Legendre's equation in number theory
- Legendre's functional relation for elliptic integrals
- Legendre's conjecture
- Legendre sieve
- Legendre symbol
- Legendre's theorem on spherical triangles
- Saccheri–Legendre theorem
- Least squares
- Least-squares spectral analysis
- Seconds pendulum
- From Summetria to Symmetry: The Making of a Revolutionary Scientific Concept
