= Legendre's equation =

Special diophantine equation involving squares

In mathematics, Legendre's equation is a Diophantine equation of the form:

$$ax^2+by^2+cz^2=0.$$

The equation is named for Adrien-Marie Legendre who proved it in 1785 that it is solvable in integers x, y, z, not all zero, if and only if −bc, −ca and −ab are quadratic residues modulo a, b and c, respectively, where a, b, c are nonzero, square-free, pairwise relatively prime integers and also not all positive or all negative.

== Interpretation and solution ==
Legendre's equation is homogeneous, and thus the existence of a nonzero rational solution is equivalent to the existence of a nonzero integer solution; the denominators of a rational solution can be cleared to obtain an integer one. Geometrically, the equation defines a conic in the projective plane; solving a Legendre equation over the rational numbers is equivalent to finding a rational point on a rational conic.

The quadratic residue conditions in Legendre's criterion arise in the form of necessary congruence conditions. That is, reducing the equation modulo a gives $by^2+cz^2\equiv0\pmod a$. Under the coprimality assumptions, a nontrivial solution therefore implies that $-bc$ is a quadratic residue mod a; analogous arguments give the other two conditions. Legendre's theorem establishes that, together with the requirement that the coefficients are not all of the same sign, these necessary conditions are also sufficient.

Legendre's original approach to finding a solution used a descent algorithm. Modern algorithms keep the connection with rational conics but can find rational points more efficiently.
