= History of quaternions =

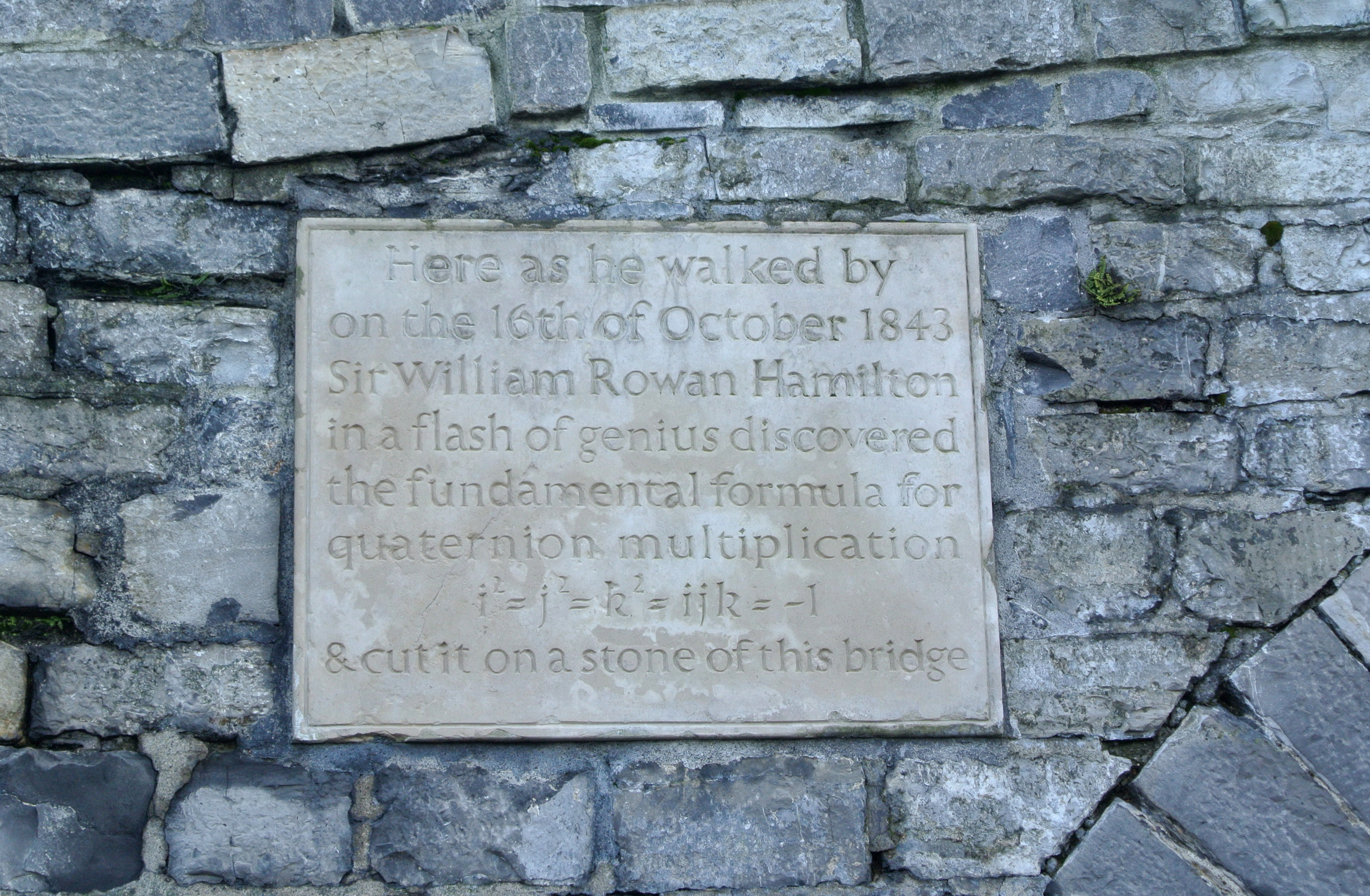
Quaternion plaque on Brougham (Broom) Bridge, Dublin, which says: Here as he walked by on the 16th of October 1843 Sir William Rowan Hamilton in a flash of genius discovered the fundamental formula for quaternion multiplication i^{2} = j^{2} = k^{2} = ijk = −1 & cut it on a stone of this bridge.

In mathematics, quaternions are a non-commutative number system that extends the complex numbers. Quaternions and their applications to rotations were first described in print by Olinde Rodrigues in all but name in 1840, but independently discovered by Irish mathematician Sir William Rowan Hamilton in 1843 and applied to mechanics in three-dimensional space. They find uses in both theoretical and applied mathematics, in particular for calculations involving three-dimensional rotations.

== Hamilton's discovery ==
In 1843, Hamilton knew that the complex numbers could be viewed as points in a plane and that they could be added and multiplied together using certain geometric operations. Hamilton sought to find a way to do the same for points in space. Points in space can be represented by their coordinates, which are triples of numbers and have an obvious addition, but Hamilton had difficulty defining the appropriate multiplication.

According to a letter Hamilton wrote later to his son Archibald:

Every morning in the early part of October 1843, on my coming down to breakfast, your brother William Edwin and yourself used to ask me: "Well, Papa, can you multiply triples?" Whereto I was always obliged to reply, with a sad shake of the head, "No, I can only add and subtract them."

On October 16, 1843, Hamilton and his wife took a walk along the Royal Canal in Dublin. While they walked across Brougham Bridge (now Broom Bridge), a solution suddenly occurred to him. While he could not "multiply triples", he saw a way to do so for quadruples. By using three of the numbers in the quadruple as the points of a coordinate in space, Hamilton could represent points in space by his new system of numbers. He then carved the basic rules for multiplication into the bridge:

i^{2} = j^{2} = k^{2} = ijk = −1

Hamilton called a quadruple with these rules of multiplication a quaternion, and he devoted the remainder of his life to studying and teaching them. From 1844 to 1850 Philosophical Magazine communicated Hamilton's exposition of quaternions. In 1853 he issued Lectures on Quaternions, a comprehensive treatise that also described biquaternions. The facility of the algebra in expressing geometric relationships led to broad acceptance of the method, several compositions by other authors, and stimulation of applied algebra generally. As mathematical terminology has grown since that time, and usage of some terms has changed, the traditional expressions are referred to as classical Hamiltonian quaternions.

== Precursors ==
Hamilton's innovation consisted of expressing quaternions as an algebra over R. The formulae for the multiplication of quaternions are implicit in the four squares formula devised by Leonhard Euler in 1748. In 1840, Olinde Rodrigues used spherical trigonometry and developed a formula closely related to quaternion multiplication in order to describe the new axis and angle of two combined rotations.

== Response ==
The special claims of quaternions as the algebra of four-dimensional space were challenged by James Cockle with his exhibits in 1848 and 1849 of tessarines and coquaternions as alternatives. Nevertheless, these new algebras from Cockle were, in fact, subalgebras of Hamilton's biquaternions. From Italy, in 1858 Giusto Bellavitis responded to connect Hamilton's vector theory with his theory of equipollences of directed line segments.

Jules Hoüel led the response from France in 1874 with a textbook on the elements of quaternions. To ease the study of versors, he introduced "biradials" to designate great circle arcs on the sphere. Then the quaternion algebra provided the foundation for spherical trigonometry introduced in chapter 9. Hoüel replaced Hamilton's basis vectors i, j, k with i_{1}, i_{2}, and i_{3}.

The variety of fonts available led Hoüel to another notational innovation: A designates a point, a and a are algebraic quantities, and in the equation for a quaternion

$$\mathcal{ A} = \cos \alpha + \mathbf{A} \sin \alpha ,$$

A is a vector and α is an angle. This style of quaternion exposition was perpetuated by Charles-Ange Laisant and Alexander Macfarlane.

William K. Clifford expanded the types of biquaternions, and explored elliptic space, a geometry in which the points can be viewed as versors. Fascination with quaternions began before the language of set theory and mathematical structures was available. In fact, there was little mathematical notation before the Formulario mathematico. The quaternions stimulated these advances: For example, the idea of a vector space borrowed Hamilton's term but changed its meaning. Under the modern understanding, any quaternion is a vector in four-dimensional space. (Hamilton's vectors lie in the subspace with scalar part zero.) Yet the utility of dot products and cross products in three-dimensional space, for illustration of processes, calls for the uses of these operations which are cut out of the quaternion product. In his treatise Electromagnetic Theory, Oliver Heaviside states, "so far as the vector analysis I required was concerned, the quaternion was not only not required, but was a positive evil of no inconsiderable magnitude."

For mathematicians the quaternion structure became familiar and lost its status as something mathematically interesting. Thus in England, when Arthur Buchheim prepared a paper on biquaternions, it was published in the American Journal of Mathematics since some novelty in the subject lingered there. Research turned to hypercomplex numbers more generally. For instance, Thomas Kirkman and Arthur Cayley considered the number of equations between basis vectors which would be necessary to determine a unique system. The wide interest that quaternions aroused around the world resulted in the Quaternion Association. In contemporary mathematics, the division ring of quaternions exemplifies an algebra over a field.

== Principal publications ==
- 1853 Lectures on Quaternions
- 1866 Elements of Quaternions
- 1873 Elementary Treatise by Peter Guthrie Tait
- 1874 Jules Hoüel: Éléments de la Théorie des Quaternions
- 1878 Abbott Lawrence Lowell: Quadrics: Harvard dissertation:
- 1882 Tait and Philip Kelland: Introduction with Examples
- 1885 Arthur Buchheim: Biquaternions
- 1887 Valentin Balbin: (Spanish) Elementos de Calculo de los Cuaterniones, Buenos Aires
- 1899 Charles Jasper Joly: Elements vol 1, vol 2 1901
- 1901 Vector Analysis by Willard Gibbs and Edwin Bidwell Wilson (quaternion ideas without quaternions)
- 1904 Cargill Gilston Knott: third edition of Kelland and Tait's textbook
- 1904 Bibliography prepared for the Quaternion Society by Alexander Macfarlane
- 1905 C.J. Joly's Manual for Quaternions
- 1940 Julian Coolidge in A History of Geometrical Methods, page 261, uses the coordinate-free methods of Hamilton's operators and cites A. L. Lawrence's work at Harvard. Coolidge uses these operators on dual quaternions to describe screw displacement in kinematics.

== Octonions ==
Octonions were developed independently by Arthur Cayley in 1845 and John T. Graves, a friend of Hamilton's. Graves had interested Hamilton in algebra, and responded to his discovery of quaternions with "If with your alchemy you can make three pounds of gold [the three imaginary units], why should you stop there?"

Two months after Hamilton's discovery of quaternions, Graves wrote Hamilton on December 26, 1843, presenting a kind of double quaternion, which he called octaves, and showed that they were what we now call a normed division algebra. Hamilton observed in reply that they were not associative, which may have been the invention of the concept. He also promised to get Graves' work published, but did little about it. Hamilton needed a way to distinguish between two different types of double quaternions, the associative biquaternions and the octaves. He spoke about them to the Royal Irish Society and credited his friend Graves for the discovery of the second type of double quaternion.

Cayley, working independently of Graves, but inspired by Hamilton's publication of his own work, published on octonions in March 1845 – as an appendix to a paper on a different subject. Hamilton was stung into protesting Graves' priority in discovery, if not publication; nevertheless, octonions are known by the name Cayley gave them – or as Cayley numbers.

The major deduction from the existence of octonions was the eight squares theorem, which follows directly from the product rule from octonions. It had also been previously discovered as a purely algebraic identity by Carl Ferdinand Degen in 1818. This sum-of-squares identity is characteristic of composition algebra, a feature of complex numbers, quaternions, and octonions.

== Mathematical uses ==
Quaternions continued to be a well-studied mathematical structure in the twentieth century, as the third term in the Cayley–Dickson construction of hypercomplex number systems over the reals, followed by the octonions, the sedenions, the trigintaduonions; they are also a useful tool in number theory, particularly in the study of the representation of numbers as sums of squares. The group of eight basic unit quaternions, positive and negative, the quaternion group, is also the simplest non-commutative Sylow group.

The study of integral quaternions began with Rudolf Lipschitz in 1886, whose system was later simplified by Leonard Eugene Dickson; but the modern system was published by Adolf Hurwitz in 1919. The difference between them consists of which quaternions are accounted integral: Lipschitz included only those quaternions with integral coordinates, but Hurwitz added those quaternions all four of whose coordinates are half-integers. Both systems are closed under subtraction and multiplication, and are therefore rings, but Lipschitz's system does not permit unique factorization, while Hurwitz's does.

== Quaternions as rotations ==
Quaternions are a concise method of representing the automorphisms of three- and four-dimensional spaces. They have the technical advantage that unit quaternions form the simply connected cover of the space of three-dimensional rotations.

For this reason, quaternions are used in computer graphics, control theory, robotics, signal processing, attitude control, physics, bioinformatics, and orbital mechanics. For example, it is common for spacecraft attitude-control systems to be commanded in terms of quaternions. Tomb Raider (1996) is often cited as the first mass-market computer game to have used quaternions to achieve smooth 3D rotation. Quaternions have received another boost from number theory because of their relation to quadratic forms.

== Memorial ==
Since 1989, the Department of Mathematics of the National University of Ireland, Maynooth has organized a pilgrimage, where scientists (including physicists Murray Gell-Mann in 2002, Steven Weinberg in 2005, Frank Wilczek in 2007, and mathematician Andrew Wiles in 2003) take a walk from Dunsink Observatory to the Royal Canal bridge where no trace of Hamilton's carving remains.

== Family of algebras ==
Since the algebra of the split-quaternions is isomorphic to M(2, R) and the algebra of biquaternions is isomorphic to M(2, C), there is a connection between quaternions and 2 x 2 square matrices over a field. Hamilton's real quaternions are included by the "extension of scalars" to the complex field C. The general class of quaternion algebras is associated with M(2, F) where F is a local field or a global field. Martin Eichler, Hideo Shimizu and Irving Reiner contributed to this line of algebraic development.
