= Hurwitz problem =

In mathematics, the Hurwitz problem (named after Adolf Hurwitz) is the problem of finding multiplicative relations between quadratic forms which generalise those known to exist between sums of squares in certain numbers of variables.

== Description ==
There are well-known multiplicative relationships between sums of squares in two variables

$$(x^2+y^2)(u^2+v^2) = (xu-yv)^2 + (xv+yu)^2 \ ,$$

(known as the Brahmagupta–Fibonacci identity), and also Euler's four-square identity and Degen's eight-square identity. These may be interpreted as multiplicativity for the norms on the complex numbers ($\mathbb{C}$), quaternions ($\mathbb{H}$), and octonions ($\mathbb{O}$), respectively.

The Hurwitz problem for the field K is to find general relations of the form

$$(x_1^2+\cdots+x_r^2) \cdot (y_1^2+\cdots+y_s^2) = (z_1^2 + \cdots + z_n^2) \ ,$$

with the z being bilinear forms in the x and y: that is, each z is a K-linear combination of terms of the form x_{i} y_{j}.

We call a triple $\; (r, s, n) \;$ admissible for K if such an identity exists. Trivial cases of admissible triples include $\; (r, s, rs) \;.$ The problem is uninteresting for K of characteristic 2, since over such fields every sum of squares is a square, and we exclude this case. It is believed that otherwise admissibility is independent of the field of definition.

== The Hurwitz–Radon theorem ==
Hurwitz posed the problem in 1898 in the special case $\; r = s = n \;$ and showed that, when coefficients are taken in $\mathbb{C}$, the only admissible values $\, (n, n, n) \,$ were $\; n \in \{ 1, 2, 4, 8 \} \;.$ His proof extends to a field of any characteristic except 2.

The "Hurwitz–Radon" problem is that of finding admissible triples of the form $\, (r, n, n) \;.$ Obviously $\; (1, n, n) \;$ is admissible. The Hurwitz–Radon theorem states that $\; \left( \rho(n), n, n \right) \;$ is admissible over any field where $\, \rho(n) \,$ is the function defined for $\; n = 2^u v\;,$ v odd, $\; u = 4 a + b \;,$ with $\; 0 \le b \le 3 \;,$ and $\; \rho(n) = 8 a + 2^b\;.$

Other admissible triples include $\, (3, 5, 7) \,$ and $\, (10, 10, 16) \;.$

== See also ==
- Composition algebra
- Hurwitz's theorem (normed division algebras)
- Radon–Hurwitz number
