= Shimizu (surname) =

Shimizu (written: 清水 lit. "pure water") is the 18th most common Japanese surname. Less common variants include 志水 and 冷水.

== Notable people with the surname ==
- Ai Shimizu (清水 愛; born 1981), Japanese voice actress and professional wrestler
- Airi Shimizu (清水 あいり; born 1992), Japanese gravure idol, actress and television personality
- Aki Shimizu (志水 アキ), Japanese manga artist
- Akihiko Shimizu (清水 明彦; born 1962), Japanese actor and voice actor
- Alex Shimizu (living), American film and television actor
- Ayano Shimizu (清水 綾乃; born 1998), Japanese tennis player
- Bukō Shimizu (清水 武甲; 1913–1995), Japanese photographer
- Dafne Shimizu (born 1973), Guamanian politician
- Dave Shimizu (living), American politician
- Emi Shimizu (清水 絵美; born 1990), Japanese female curler
- Fujio Shimizu (清水 富士夫; born 1940), Japanese fencer
- Fumika Shimizu (清水 富美加; born 1994), Japanese actress, gravure idol and model
- Hide Hyodo Shimizu (1908–1999), Japanese-Canadian educator and activist
- Hidehiko Shimizu (清水 秀彦; born 1954), Japanese footballer and manager
- Hideo Shimizu (清水 英男; fl. 1963), Japanese mathematician
- Hikari Shimizu (清水ひかり; born 1993), Japanese professional wrestler
- Hikaru Shimizu (清水 光; born 1996), Japanese footballer
- Hiroko Shimizu (清水 弘子; born 1977), Japanese professional bowler
- Hiroshi Shimizu (director) (清水 宏; 1903–1966), Japanese film director
- Hiroyasu Shimizu (清水 宏保; born 1974), Japanese Olympic speed skater
- Hitomi Shimizu (冷水 ひとみ), Japanese musician and composer
- Ichiyo Shimizu (清水 市代; born 1969), Japanese shogi player
- Ikutarō Shimizu (清水 幾太郎; 1907–1988), Japanese critic
- Ittetsu Shimizu (清水 一徹; born 1976), Japanese classical composer
- Jenny Shimizu (born 1967), American model and actress
- Jirochō Shimizu (清水 次郎長; 1820–1893), Japanese yakuza boss
- Kaori Shimizu (清水 香里; born 1983), Japanese actress and voice actress
- Kazuki Shimizu (清水 一希; born 1990), Japanese actor
- Kazumasa Shimizu (清水 和昌; born 1976), Japanese footballer
- Kazuo Shimizu (清水 和男; born 1975), Japanese footballer
- Kazuo Shimizu (driver) (清水 和夫; born 1954), Japanese racing driver
- Kazuo Shimizu (wrestler) (清水 一夫; born 1954), Japanese sport wrestler
- Kazuya Shimizu (清水 和也; born 1997), Japanese futsal player
- Kei Shimizu (清水 圭太; born 1961), Japanese comedian
- Keigo Shimizu (清水 啓吾; born 1939), Japanese Olympic swimmer
- Keiki Shimizu (清水 慶記; born 1985), Japanese footballer
- Keisuke Shimizu (清水 圭介; born 1988), Japanese footballer
- Ken Shimizu (清水 健; born 1979), Japanese pornographic film actor
- Kengo Shimizu (清水 賢吾; born 1983), Japanese kickboxer
- Kenji Shimizu (清水 健二; born 1940), Japanese aikido teacher and style founder
- Kenta Shimizu (清水 健太; born 1981), Japanese footballer
- Kentaro Shimizu (清水 健太郎; born 1952), Japanese actor and singer
- Keto Shimizu (born 1984), American television and comic book writer
- Kinjiro Shimizu (清水 金二郎), Japanese footballer
- Kiyotaka Shimizu (清水 清隆; born 1984), Japanese mixed martial artist
- Kohei Shimizu (清水 航平; born 1989), Japanese footballer
- Kohei Shimizu (skier) (清水 康平; born 1989), Japanese cross-country skier
- Koichiro Shimizu (清水 鴻一郎; born 1946), Japanese doctor and politician
- Kojiro Shimizu (清水 宏次朗; born 1964), Japanese actor and singer
- Kotaro Shimizu (清水 孝太郎; born 1911, deceased), Japanese track and field athlete
- Koya Shimizu (清水 康也; born 1982), Japanese footballer
- Kōji Shimizu (清水 康次; born 1969), Japanese long-distance runner
- Kunihiro Shimizu (清水 邦広; born 1986), Japanese volleyball player
- Kunio Shimizu (清水 邦夫; 1936–2021), Japanese playwright
- Maho Shimizu (清水 万帆; born 1960), Japanese women's footballer
- Mari Shimizu (清水 マリ; born 1936), Japanese voice actress
- Masahiro Shimizu (清水 雅広; born 1964), Japanese motorcycle racer
- Masaji Shimizu (清水 雅治; born 1964), Japanese baseball player
- Masao Shimizu (清水 将夫; 1908–1975), Japanese actor
- Masataka Shimizu (清水 政孝; born 1944), Japanese company executive
- Masatoshi Shimizu (清水 正俊; born 1948), Japanese Olympic rower
- Masaumi Shimizu (清水 将海; born 1975), Japanese baseball player and coach
- Masayoshi Shimizu (清水 聖義; born 1941), Japanese politician
- Michiko Shimizu (athlete) (志水 見千子; born 1970), Japanese long-distance runner
- Michiko Shimizu (entertainer) (清水 ミチコ; born 1960), Japanese comedian and actress
- Minami Shimizu (清水 美並; born 1993), Japanese field hockey player
- Misa Shimizu (清水 美沙; born 1970), Japanese actress
- Mitsumi Shimizu (清水 光美; 1888–1971), Imperial Japanese Navy admiral
- Miyataka Shimizu (清水 都貴; born 1981), Japanese cyclist
- Momoko Shimizu (清水 萌々子; born 1997), Japanese child actress
- Mototsugu Shimizu (清水 基嗣; born 1977), Japanese professional wrestler
- Motoyoshi Shimizu (清水 基吉; 1918–2008), Japanese writer and poet
- Shimizu Muneharu (清水 宗治; 1537–1582), Japanese samurai
- Naoemon Shimizu (清水 直右衛門; died 1945), Japanese footballer
- Naoyuki Shimizu (清水 直行; born 1975), Japanese baseball player
- Norihisa Shimizu (清水 範久; born 1976), Japanese footballer
- Nozomi Shimizu (清水 望; born 1996), Japanese badminton player
- Reiko Shimizu (清水 玲子; born 1963), Japanese manga artist
- Reruhi Shimizu (清水 礼留飛; born 1993), Japanese ski jumper
- Risa Shimizu (actress) (清水 理沙; born 1988), Japanese actress and voice actress
- Risa Shimizu (footballer) (清水 梨紗; born 1996), Japanese football player
- Ryosuke Shimizu (born 1980), Japanese karateka
- Ryotaro Shimizu (清水 良太郎; born 1988), Japanese actor and impressionist
- Ryuzo Shimizu (清水 隆三; 1902–?), Japanese footballer
- Saki Shimizu (清水 佐紀; born 1991), Japanese singer
- Sakiko Shimizu (清水 咲子; born 1992), Japanese swimmer
- Satomu Shimizu (清水 三十六; 1903–1967), pen name of Shugoro Yamamoto, Japanese writer
- Satoshi Shimizu (清水 聡; born 1986), Japanese boxer
- Sayuri Shimizu (清水 小百合; born 1989), Japanese speed skater
- Seiichiro Shimizu (清水 清一朗; born 1947), Japanese politician
- Seiki Shimizu (清水 正紀), Japanese writer
- Shigeto Shimizu (清水 茂人; born 1953), Japanese basketball player
- Shimizu Shikin (清水 紫琴; 1868–1933), pen name of Shimizu Toyoko, Japanese writer and activist
- Shintaro Shimizu (清水 慎太郎; born 1992), Japanese footballer
- Shota Shimizu (清水 翔太; born 1989), Japanese musician and singer-songwriter
- Shunichi Shimizu (清水 俊一; born 1985), Japanese mixed martial artist
- Shunji Shimizu (清水 俊二; 1906–1988), Japanese subtitler and translator
- Tadashi Shimizu (清水 忠史), Japanese communist politician
- Takafumi Shimizu (清水 貴文; born 1992), Japanese footballer
- Takaji Shimizu, Japanese jojutsuka
- Takashi Shimizu (清水 崇; born 1972), Japanese film director
- Takashi Shimizu (baseball) (清水 誉; born 1984), Japanese baseball player
- Takayuki Shimizu (baseball) (清水 隆行; born 1973), Japanese baseball player
- Takayuki Shimizu (politician) (清水 貴之; born 1974), Japanese politician
- Tatsuya Shimizu (清水 達也; born 1999), Japanese baseball player
- Tetsuro Shimizu (清水 徹郎; born 1988), Japanese curler
- Tokiko Shimizu (清水 季子), Japanese banker
- Trevor Shimizu (born 1978), American visual artist
- Shimizu Tōkoku (清水 東谷; 1841–1907), Japanese photographer
- Tomonobu Shimizu (清水 智信; born 1981), Japanese boxer
- Shimizu Toshi (清水 登之; 1887–1945), Japanese painter
- Tsunenori Shimizu (清水 規矩; 1897–1968), Japanese general
- Yasuaki Shimizu (清水 靖晃; born 1954), Japanese composer, producer and saxophonist
- Yasuhiro Shimizu (清水 康弘; born 1958), Japanese speed skater
- Yasuzo Shimizu (清水 安三; 1891–1988), Japanese educator and Christian missionary
- Yoji Shimizu (柴田 徹; born 1941), Japanese water polo player
- Yoshinori Shimizu (清水 義範; born 1947), Japanese writer
- Yoshinori Shimizu (basketball) (清水 良規; born 1949), Japanese basketball player, coach and executive
- Yoshiro Shimizu (清水 芳郎; born 1993), Japanese curler
- Yoshisada Shimizu (清水 義定; born 1943), Japanese astronomer
- Yoshiyuki Shimizu (清水 祥之; born 1969), Japanese speed skater
- Yuki Shimizu (志水 ゆき), Japanese manga artist
- Yuko Shimizu (清水 侑子; born 1946), Japanese designer and creator of Hello Kitty
- Yuko Shimizu (actress) (清水 ゆう子; born 1988), Japanese actress and gravure idol
- Yuko Shimizu (illustrator) (清水 裕子), Japanese illustrator
- Yūshi Shimizu (清水 優心; born 1996), Japanese baseball player
- Yusuke Shimizu (志水 祐介; born 1988), Japanese water polo player
- Zenzo Shimizu (清水 善造; 1891–1977), Japanese tennis player

== Fictional characters ==
- Esora Shimizu (清水絵空), a member of the unit "Peaky P-Key" in the anime franchise D4DJ.
- Hirono Shimizu (清水 比呂乃), a character in the novel Battle Royale
- Keiichi Shimizu (志水 桂一), a character in the video game series La Corda d'Oro
- Kiyoko Shimizu (清水 潔子), a character in the manga series Haikyū!!
- Megumi Shimizu (清水 恵), a character in the novel Shiki
- Takako Shimizu (清水 多香子), a character in the manga series Chobits
- Yukitoshi Shimizu (清水幸利, Shimizu Yukitoshi), a character in the Light Novel Series Arifureta

== See also ==
- Makoto (musician) aka Makoto Shimizu, born 1977, Japanese musical artist
