= Joseph Tilly =

Belgian mathematician and military man

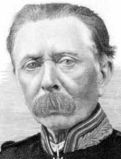
Joseph Marie de Tilly

Joseph Marie de Tilly (16 August 1837 – 4 August 1906) was a Belgian military man and mathematician.

He was born in Ypres, Belgium. In 1858, he became a teacher in mathematics at the regimental school. He began with studying geometry, particularly Euclid's fifth postulate and non-Euclidean geometry. He found similar results as Lobachevsky in 1860, but the Russian mathematician was already dead at that time. Tilly is more known for his work on non-Euclidean mechanics, as he was the one who invented it. He worked thus alone on this topic until a French mathematician, Jules Hoüel, showed interest in that field. Tilly also wrote on military science and history of mathematics. He died in Munich in the German Empire.
