= Albrecht Pfister (mathematician) =

German mathematician

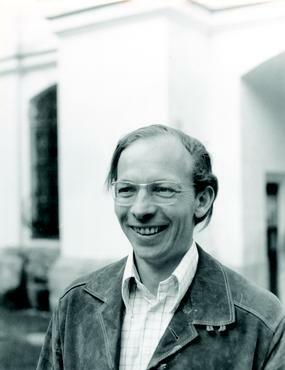
- Albrecht Pfister 1976
- Born: 30 July 1934 (age 92); München, Germany
- Education: Ludwig-Maximilians-Universität München
- Known for: Pfister form Pfister's identity Pfister's sixteen-square identity
- Awards: ICM Speaker (1970)
- Scientific career
- Fields: Mathematics
- Workplaces: University of Mainz
- Doctoral advisor: Martin Kneser; Karl Stein

Albrecht Pfister (born July 30, 1934) is a German mathematician specializing in algebra and in particular quadratic forms.

Pfister received his doctoral degree in 1961 at the Ludwig-Maximilians-Universität München. The title of his doctoral thesis was Über das Koeffizientenproblem der beschränkten Funktionen von zwei Veränderlichen ("On the coefficient problem of the bounded functions of two variables"). His thesis advisors were Martin Kneser and Karl Stein. In 1966, he received his habilitation at the Georg August University of Göttingen. From 1970 until his retirement he was professor at the Johannes Gutenberg University of Mainz.

In the theory of quadratic forms over fields, the Pfister forms that he introduced in 1965 bear his name.

In 1970, he was an invited speaker on the topic Sums of squares in real function fields at the International Congress of Mathematicians in Nice.

== Writings ==
- 1965: "Multiplikative quadratische Formen", Archiv der Mathematik, doi:10.1007/BF01220043
- 1990: Quadratische Formen. In: Fischer, Hirzebruch et al. (eds.): 100 Jahre Mathematik 1890–1990. Vieweg
- 1995: Quadratic forms with applications to algebraic geometry and topology. In: London Mathematical Society Lecture Notes. Cambridge University Press
