= Pfister's sixteen-square identity =

In algebra, Pfister's sixteen-square identity is a non-bilinear identity of form

$$\left(x_1^2+x_2^2+x_3^2+\cdots+x_{16}^2\right)\left(y_1^2+y_2^2+y_3^2+\cdots+y_{16}^2\right) = z_1^2+z_2^2+z_3^2+\cdots+z_{16}^2$$

It was first proven to exist by H. Zassenhaus and W. Eichhorn in the 1960s, and independently by Albrecht Pfister around the same time. There are several versions, a concise one of which is

$$\begin{align}
&\scriptstyle{z_1 = {\color{blue}{x_1 y_1 - x_2 y_2 - x_3 y_3 - x_4 y_4 - x_5 y_5 - x_6 y_6 - x_7 y_7 - x_8 y_8}} + u_1 y_9 - u_2 y_{10} - u_3 y_{11} - u_4 y_{12} - u_5 y_{13} - u_6 y_{14} - u_7 y_{15} - u_8 y_{16}} \\
&\scriptstyle{z_2 = {\color{blue}{x_2 y_1 + x_1 y_2 + x_4 y_3 - x_3 y_4 + x_6 y_5 - x_5 y_6 - x_8 y_7 + x_7 y_8}} + u_2 y_9 + u_1 y_{10} + u_4 y_{11} - u_3 y_{12} + u_6 y_{13} - u_5 y_{14} - u_8 y_{15} + u_7 y_{16}} \\
&\scriptstyle{z_3 = {\color{blue}{x_3 y_1 - x_4 y_2 + x_1 y_3 + x_2 y_4 + x_7 y_5 + x_8 y_6 - x_5 y_7 - x_6 y_8}} + u_3 y_9 - u_4 y_{10} + u_1 y_{11} + u_2 y_{12} + u_7 y_{13} + u_8 y_{14} - u_5 y_{15} - u_6 y_{16}} \\
&\scriptstyle{z_4 = {\color{blue}{x_4 y_1 + x_3 y_2 - x_2 y_3 + x_1 y_4 + x_8 y_5 - x_7 y_6 + x_6 y_7 - x_5 y_8}} + u_4 y_9 + u_3 y_{10} - u_2 y_{11} + u_1 y_{12} + u_8 y_{13} - u_7 y_{14} + u_6 y_{15} - u_5 y_{16}} \\
&\scriptstyle{z_5 = {\color{blue}{x_5 y_1 - x_6 y_2 - x_7 y_3 - x_8 y_4 + x_1 y_5 + x_2 y_6 + x_3 y_7 + x_4 y_8}} + u_5 y_9 - u_6 y_{10} - u_7 y_{11} - u_8 y_{12} + u_1 y_{13} + u_2 y_{14} + u_3 y_{15} + u_4 y_{16}} \\
&\scriptstyle{z_6 = {\color{blue}{x_6 y_1 + x_5 y_2 - x_8 y_3 + x_7 y_4 - x_2 y_5 + x_1 y_6 - x_4 y_7 + x_3 y_8}} + u_6 y_9 + u_5 y_{10} - u_8 y_{11} + u_7 y_{12} - u_2 y_{13} + u_1 y_{14} - u_4 y_{15} + u_3 y_{16}} \\
&\scriptstyle{z_7 = {\color{blue}{x_7 y_1 + x_8 y_2 + x_5 y_3 - x_6 y_4 - x_3 y_5 + x_4 y_6 + x_1 y_7 - x_2 y_8}} + u_7 y_9 + u_8 y_{10} + u_5 y_{11} - u_6 y_{12} - u_3 y_{13} + u_4 y_{14} + u_1 y_{15} - u_2 y_{16}} \\
&\scriptstyle{z_8 = {\color{blue}{x_8 y_1 - x_7 y_2 + x_6 y_3 + x_5 y_4 - x_4 y_5 - x_3 y_6 + x_2 y_7 + x_1 y_8}} + u_8 y_9 - u_7 y_{10} + u_6 y_{11} + u_5 y_{12} - u_4 y_{13} - u_3 y_{14} + u_2 y_{15} + u_1 y_{16}} \\
&\scriptstyle{z_9  =  x_9 y_1 - x_{10} y_2 - x_{11} y_3 - x_{12} y_4 - x_{13} y_5 - x_{14} y_6 - x_{15} y_7 - x_{16} y_8 + x_1 y_9 - x_2 y_{10} - x_3 y_{11} - x_4 y_{12} - x_5 y_{13} - x_6 y_{14} - x_7 y_{15} - x_8 y_{16}} \\
&\scriptstyle{z_{10} = x_{10} y_1 + x_9 y_2 + x_{12} y_3 - x_{11} y_4 + x_{14} y_5 - x_{13} y_6 - x_{16} y_7 + x_{15} y_8 + x_2 y_9 + x_1 y_{10} + x_4 y_{11} - x_3 y_{12} + x_6 y_{13} - x_5 y_{14} - x_8 y_{15} + x_7 y_{16}} \\
&\scriptstyle{z_{11} = x_{11} y_1 - x_{12} y_2 + x_9 y_3 + x_{10} y_4 + x_{15} y_5 + x_{16} y_6 - x_{13} y_7 - x_{14} y_8 + x_3 y_9 - x_4 y_{10} + x_1 y_{11} + x_2 y_{12} + x_7 y_{13} + x_8 y_{14} - x_5 y_{15} - x_6 y_{16}} \\
&\scriptstyle{z_{12} = x_{12} y_1 + x_{11} y_2 - x_{10} y_3 + x_9 y_4 + x_{16} y_5 - x_{15} y_6 + x_{14} y_7 - x_{13} y_8 + x_4 y_9 + x_3 y_{10} - x_2 y_{11} + x_1 y_{12} + x_8 y_{13} - x_7 y_{14} + x_6 y_{15} - x_5 y_{16}} \\
&\scriptstyle{z_{13} = x_{13} y_1 - x_{14} y_2 - x_{15} y_3 - x_{16} y_4 + x_9 y_5 + x_{10} y_6 + x_{11} y_7 + x_{12} y_8 + x_5 y_9 - x_6 y_{10} - x_7 y_{11} - x_8 y_{12} + x_1 y_{13} + x_2 y_{14} + x_3 y_{15} + x_4 y_{16}} \\
&\scriptstyle{z_{14} = x_{14} y_1 + x_{13} y_2 - x_{16} y_3 + x_{15} y_4 - x_{10} y_5 + x_9 y_6 - x_{12} y_7 + x_{11} y_8 + x_6 y_9 + x_5 y_{10} - x_8 y_{11} + x_7 y_{12} - x_2 y_{13} + x_1 y_{14} - x_4 y_{15} + x_3 y_{16}} \\
&\scriptstyle{z_{15} = x_{15} y_1 + x_{16} y_2 + x_{13} y_3 - x_{14} y_4 - x_{11} y_5 + x_{12} y_6 + x_9 y_7 - x_{10} y_8 + x_7 y_9 + x_8 y_{10} + x_5 y_{11} - x_6 y_{12} - x_3 y_{13} + x_4 y_{14} + x_1 y_{15} - x_2 y_{16}} \\
&\scriptstyle{z_{16} = x_{16} y_1 - x_{15} y_2 + x_{14} y_3 + x_{13} y_4 - x_{12} y_5 - x_{11} y_6 + x_{10} y_7 + x_9 y_8 + x_8 y_9 - x_7 y_{10} + x_6 y_{11} + x_5 y_{12} - x_4 y_{13} - x_3 y_{14} + x_2 y_{15} + x_1 y_{16}}
\end{align}$$

If all $x_i$ and $y_i$ with $i>8$ are set equal to zero, then it reduces to Degen's eight-square identity (in blue). The $u_i$ are

$$\begin{align}
&u_1 = \tfrac{\left(ax_1^2+x_2^2+x_3^2+x_4^2+x_5^2+x_6^2+x_7^2+x_8^2\right)x_9 - 2x_1\left(bx_1 x_9 +x_2 x_{10} +x_3 x_{11} +x_4 x_{12} +x_5 x_{13} +x_6 x_{14} +x_7 x_{15} +x_8 x_{16}\right)}{c} \\
&u_2 = \tfrac{\left(x_1^2+ax_2^2+x_3^2+x_4^2+x_5^2+x_6^2+x_7^2+x_8^2\right)x_{10} - 2x_2\left(x_1 x_9 +bx_2 x_{10} +x_3 x_{11} +x_4 x_{12} +x_5 x_{13} +x_6 x_{14} +x_7 x_{15} +x_8 x_{16}\right)}{c} \\
&u_3 = \tfrac{\left(x_1^2+x_2^2+ax_3^2+x_4^2+x_5^2+x_6^2+x_7^2+x_8^2\right)x_{11} - 2x_3\left(x_1 x_9 +x_2 x_{10} +bx_3 x_{11} +x_4 x_{12} +x_5 x_{13} +x_6 x_{14} +x_7 x_{15} +x_8 x_{16}\right)}{c} \\
&u_4 = \tfrac{\left(x_1^2+x_2^2+x_3^2+ax_4^2+x_5^2+x_6^2+x_7^2+x_8^2\right)x_{12} - 2x_4\left(x_1 x_9 +x_2 x_{10} +x_3 x_{11} +bx_4 x_{12} +x_5 x_{13} +x_6 x_{14} +x_7 x_{15} +x_8 x_{16}\right)}{c} \\
&u_5 = \tfrac{\left(x_1^2+x_2^2+x_3^2+x_4^2+ax_5^2+x_6^2+x_7^2+x_8^2\right)x_{13} - 2x_5\left(x_1 x_9 +x_2 x_{10} +x_3 x_{11} +x_4 x_{12} +bx_5 x_{13} +x_6 x_{14} +x_7 x_{15} +x_8 x_{16}\right)}{c} \\
&u_6 = \tfrac{\left(x_1^2+x_2^2+x_3^2+x_4^2+x_5^2+ax_6^2+x_7^2+x_8^2\right)x_{14} - 2x_6\left(x_1 x_9 +x_2 x_{10} +x_3 x_{11} +x_4 x_{12} +x_5 x_{13} +bx_6 x_{14} +x_7 x_{15} +x_8 x_{16}\right)}{c} \\
&u_7 = \tfrac{\left(x_1^2+x_2^2+x_3^2+x_4^2+x_5^2+x_6^2+ax_7^2+x_8^2\right)x_{15} - 2x_7\left(x_1 x_9 +x_2 x_{10} +x_3 x_{11} +x_4 x_{12} +x_5 x_{13} +x_6 x_{14} +bx_7 x_{15} +x_8 x_{16}\right)}{c} \\
&u_8 = \tfrac{\left(x_1^2+x_2^2+x_3^2+x_4^2+x_5^2+x_6^2+x_7^2+ax_8^2\right)x_{16} - 2x_8\left(x_1 x_9 +x_2 x_{10} +x_3 x_{11} +x_4 x_{12} +x_5 x_{13} +x_6 x_{14} +x_7 x_{15} +bx_8 x_{16}\right)}{c}
\end{align}$$

and,

$$a=-1,\;\;b=0,\;\;c=x_1^2+x_2^2+x_3^2+x_4^2+x_5^2+x_6^2+x_7^2+x_8^2\,.$$

The identity shows that, in general, the product of two sums of sixteen squares is the sum of sixteen rational squares. Incidentally, the $u_i$ also obey,

$$u_1^2+u_2^2+u_3^2+u_4^2+u_5^2+u_6^2+u_7^2+u_8^2 = x_{9}^2+x_{10}^2+x_{11}^2+x_{12}^2+x_{13}^2+x_{14}^2+x_{15}^2+x_{16}^2$$

No sixteen-square identity exists involving only bilinear functions since Hurwitz's theorem states an identity of the form

$$\left(x_1^2+x_2^2+x_3^2+\cdots+x_n^2)(y_1^2+y_2^2+y_3^2+\cdots+y_n^2\right) = z_1^2+z_2^2+z_3^2+\cdots+z_n^2$$

with the $z_i$ bilinear functions of the $x_i$ and $y_i$ is possible only for n ∈ {1, 2, 4, 8} . However, the more general Pfister's theorem (1965) shows that if the $z_i$ are rational functions of one set of variables, hence has a denominator, then it is possible for all $n = 2^m$. There are also non-bilinear versions of Euler's four-square and Degen's eight-square identities.

== See also ==
- Brahmagupta–Fibonacci identity
- Euler's four-square identity
- Degen's eight-square identity
- Sedenion
