= Tokiko =

- Gender: Female

Origin
- Origin: Japanese
- Meaning: Different meanings depending on the kanji used

Tokiko (written: 時子, 時鼓, 季子 or 登紀子 or 斗貴子 or 兎季子) is a feminine Japanese given name. Notable people with the name include:

- Tokiko Iwatani (岩谷 時子; 1916–2013), Japanese lyricist, poet and translator
- Tokiko Kato (加藤 登紀子; born 1943), Japanese singer-songwriter and actress
- Tokiko Ozeki (大関 時子; born 1950), Japanese cross-country skier
- Tokiko Shimizu (清水 季子), Japanese banker
- Taira no Tokiko (平 時子; 1126–1185), wife of Taira no Kiyomori, Japanese samurai

== Fictional characters ==
- Tokiko Magami (真神 時鼓), character in the manga series X
- Tokiko Tsuji, a character in Corpse Party
- Tokiko Tsumura (津村 斗貴子), protagonist of the manga series Buso Renkin
- Tokiko Mima (巳真 兎季子), the eponymous Key in Key the Metal Idol

== See also ==
- Tōkikō, a treatise that describes the Japanese pottery trade with Asia
