= Carl Ferdinand Degen =

Danish mathematician (1766–1825)

- Born: 1 November 1766; Braunschweig, Germany
- Died: 8 April 1825 (aged 58); Copenhagen, Denmark
- Burial place: Assistens Cemetery (Copenhagen)
- Education: University of Copenhagen
- Occupation: mathematician
- Known for: contributions within number theory
- Notable work: see Mathematical contributions
- Father: Johan Philip Degen

Carl Ferdinand Degen (1 November 1766 – 8 April 1825) was a Danish mathematician. His most important contributions were within number theory and he advised the young, aspiring Norwegian mathematician Niels Henrik Abel in a decisive way. Degen has received much of the credit for the introduction of more modern and advanced mathematics in the Danish-Norwegian school system.

He was born in Braunschweig in Germany, but the family moved to Copenhagen in 1771 when his father Johan Philip Degen got a position in the Royal Danish Orchestra. As a musician he had a low salary, but his son Carl Ferdinand received a fellowship so that he could go to school in Helsingør. He graduated from there in 1783 and continued at the University of Copenhagen. Instead of following the normal path of studies, the young Degen followed his own interests and read classical languages, philosophy, natural sciences and in particular mathematics. When the university in 1792 for the first time announced a prize essay contest in several different fields with an award of 40 riksdaler in each, Degen won the prize both in theology and in mathematics. He was fluent in Latin, Greek and Hebrew, was well-acquainted with Romance and Germanic languages and could read Russian and Polish. In this period he was tutor in mathematics for the young prince who later became king Christian VIII of Denmark. In 1798 Degen was made a Doctor of Philosophy based on a thesis on Kant's philosophy and was elected to the Royal Danish Academy of Sciences and Letters in 1800.

In 1802 Degen got his first academic position as head teacher in mathematics and physics at the Odense cathedral school. After a few years there he was appointed rector at the corresponding school in Viborg. There he remained until 1814 when he became professor in mathematics at the University of Copenhagen. Although his lectures were not so well organized, he was loved by his students and he infused the courses with new and more modern mathematics. At the same time he pursued his own research and published results in many different directions. All this made him the most esteemed mathematician in Scandinavia at that time.

When Niels Henrik Abel as a student visited Degen in Copenhagen, he described him as very kind, but a little strange, with a large, private library. Degen remained there until his death in 1825. For that reason he did not live to see the great fame the young Abel shortly afterwards obtained from his discovery of elliptic functions which Degen had encouraged. He is buried on the Assistens Kirkegård at Nørrebro in Copenhagen.

== Mathematical contributions ==
Degen worked in many branches of what was then modern mathematics. Most of his contributions had to do with problems within number theory, but he also wrote papers on geometry and mechanics.

=== The Pell equation ===
In 1817 Degen got printed his large work on the fundamental solutions (x, y) of Pell's equation x^{2} – ny^{2} = 1 where n is a positive integer. Euler had earlier shown that these could be systematically calculated with the use of continued fractions. Degen used this method and presented integer solutions for all n < 1000. The same calculations also gave approximate, but very accurate rational results for the square root of n. In addition, he also found solutions of the adjoint equation with −1 on the right hand side for the n-values when they existed. These tables of numerical results became in the following years a standard reference for the Pell equation.

=== The eight-square identity ===
While his work on the Pell equation can be considered a continuation of previous contributions made by Euler, Lagrange and Legendre to this problem, Degen's discovery of the eight-square identity was his most important and original discovery. Most probably it resulted from his attempts to generalize the Pell equation.

The two-square identity

$$(a^2 + b^2)(c^2 + d^2) = (ac + bd)^2 + (ad - bc)^2$$

had been known from the times of Diophantus. At the end of the 17th century it explained why the norm of the product of two complex numbers equals the product of their norms. Around the same time Euler showed that there is also a similar four-square identity. Later it turned out to be related to the norm of quaternions discovered by William Rowan Hamilton. In 1818 Degen presented to the Academy of Sciences in St. Petersburg where Euler had worked, his eight-square identity of exactly the same structure as the two previous identities. The following year he was elected as a «corresponding member» to the same academic society.

His work on the eight-square identity was first published in 1822. Almost thirty years later his identity was rediscovered by John T. Graves and Arthur Cayley as obeyed by the norm of octonions. These were an extension of Hamilton's quaternions. In 1898 Adolf Hurwitz proved that such identities involving 2^{k} squares can exist only for k = 0, 1, 2 and 3.

=== The encounter with Abel ===
In 1821 Niels Henrik Abel was a very gifted student in his last year at the cathedral school in Oslo. He was convinced that he had found a way to solve the quintic equation. None of his teachers or professors at the University of Oslo could find anything wrong with his work. The astronomy professor Christopher Hansteen recommended then that the paper ought to be published by the Science Academy in Copenhagen. It thus came in the hands of Degen to be evaluated. He again could not pinpoint any mistakes, but asked that this new method should first be tried out on a practical example. In a letter to Hansteen he proposed the equation x^{5} − 2x^{4} + 3x^{2} − 4x + 5 = 0. He ended the letter with the wish that

.... the time and efforts that Mr. Abel in my eyes spends on this rather sterile subject ought to be invested in a problem whose development will have the greatest consequences for Mathematical Analysis and its applications to practical investigations. I refer to elliptic transcendentals. A serious investigator with suitable qualifications for research of this kind would by no means be restricted to the many strange and beautiful properties of these most remarkable functions, but could discover a Strait of Magellan leading into the wide expanses of a vast Analytic Ocean.

This soon turned out to be a very prophetic piece of advice. Abel himself soon discovered a mistake in his investigations of the quintic equation, but continued to work on the existence of solutions. Two years later he could prove that they in general have no algebraic solutions.

Degen's recommendation to concentrate instead on the elliptic integral had most probably made some impression on the young student. In the summer of 1823 Abel was on a short visit to Copenhagen where he met Degen. In a letter to his friend and former teacher Bernt Michael Holmboe in Oslo he wrote that he had constructed elliptic functions by inverting the corresponding integrals. The following year in a letter to Degen he could report that these new functions had two periods. Although this discovery marks the beginning of a new and very important branch of modern mathematics, Abel waited with the publication of his results. That happened first in 1827. Degen had in the meantime died and was therefore unaware of the beautiful discoveries Abel had made and which he had prophesied.
