= Brahmagupta's identity =

Products of numbers of the form a^2 + nb^2 are also of that form

In algebra, Brahmagupta's identity says that, for given n, the product of two numbers of the form a^{2} + nb^{2} is itself a number of that form. In other words, the set of such numbers is closed under multiplication. Specifically:

$$(a^2 + nb^2)(c^2 + nd^2) = (ac \pm nbd)^2 + n(ad \mp bc)^2.$$

This identity holds in both the ring of integers and the ring of rational numbers, and more generally in any commutative ring.

Also, it can be viewed as a special case of the following identity:

$$(ha^2 + kb^2)(hc^2 + kd^2) = (hac \pm kbd)^2 + hk(ad \mp bc)^2.$$

== History ==
The identity is a generalization of the so-called Brahmagupta-Fibonacci identity (where n = 1) which is actually found in Diophantus' Arithmetica (III, 19). That identity was rediscovered by Brahmagupta (598–668), an Indian mathematician and astronomer, who generalized it and used it in his study of what is now called Pell's equation. His Brahmasphutasiddhanta was translated from Sanskrit into Arabic by Mohammad al-Fazari, and was subsequently translated into Latin in 1126. The identity later appeared in Fibonacci's Book of Squares in 1225.

== Application to Pell's equation ==
In its original context, Brahmagupta applied his discovery to the solution of what was later called Pell's equation, namely x^{2} − Ny^{2} = 1. Using the identity in the form

$$(x_1^2 - Ny_1^2)(x_2^2 - Ny_2^2) = (x_1x_2 + Ny_1y_2)^2 - N(x_1y_2 + x_2y_1)^2,$$

he was able to "compose" triples (x_{1}, y_{1}, k_{1}) and (x_{2}, y_{2}, k_{2}) that were solutions of x^{2} − Ny^{2} = k, to generate the new triple

$$(x_1x_2 + Ny_1y_2,\, x_1y_2 + x_2y_1,\, k_1k_2).$$

Not only did this give a way to generate infinitely many solutions to x^{2} − Ny^{2} = 1 starting with one solution, but also, by dividing such a composition by k_{1}k_{2}, integer or "nearly integer" solutions could often be obtained. The general method for solving the Pell equation given by Bhaskara II in 1150, namely the chakravala (cyclic) method, was also based on this identity.

== See also ==
- Brahmagupta polynomials
- Brahmagupta–Fibonacci identity
- Brahmagupta's interpolation formula
- Gauss composition law
- Indian mathematics
- List of Indian mathematicians
