= Jacques Philippe Marie Binet =

French mathematician, physicist and astronomer (1786-1856)

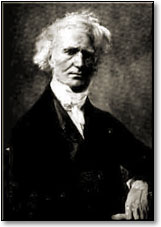
- Born: 2 February 1786; Rennes, France
- Died: 12 May 1856 (aged 70); Paris, France
- Scientific career
- Fields: Mathematics, physics, and astronomy

Jacques Philippe Marie Binet (French: [binɛ]; 2 February 1786 – 12 May 1856) was a French mathematician, physicist and astronomer born in Rennes; he died in Paris, France, in 1856. He made significant contributions to number theory, and the mathematical foundations of matrix algebra which would later lead to important contributions by Cayley and others. In his memoir on the theory of the conjugate axis and of the moment of inertia of bodies he enumerated the principle now known as Binet's theorem. He is also recognized as the first to describe the rule for multiplying matrices in 1812, and Binet's formula expressing Fibonacci numbers in closed form is named in his honour, although the same result was known to Abraham de Moivre a century earlier.

== Career ==
Binet graduated from l'École Polytechnique in 1806, and returned as a teacher in 1807. He advanced in position until 1816 when he became an inspector of studies at l'École. He held this post until 13 November 1830, when he was dismissed by the recently sworn in King Louis-Philippe of France, probably because of Binet's strong support of the previous King, Charles X. In 1823 Binet succeeded Delambre in the chair of astronomy at the Collège de France. He was made a Chevalier in the Légion d'Honneur in 1821, and was elected to the Académie des Sciences in 1843.

== Binet's Fibonacci number formula ==
The Fibonacci sequence is defined by

- $u_0 = 0$
- $u_1 = 1$
- $u_n = u_{n-1} + u_{n-2},\text{ for }n > 1$

Binet's formula provides a closed-form expression for the $n^\text{th}$ term in this sequence:

$u_n = \frac{(1 + \sqrt{5})^n - (1 - \sqrt{5})^n}{2^n \sqrt{5}}$

Given:

$\varphi = {(1 + \sqrt{5}) \over 2}$

a simplified version of Binet's formula is:

$u_n = \left\lfloor{{\varphi^n \over \sqrt{5}} + \frac 1 2}\right\rfloor$.

== See also ==
- Binet–Cauchy identity
- Binet equation
- Cauchy–Binet formula
- Matrix multiplication
