= Binet–Cauchy identity =

On products of sums of series products

In algebra, the Binet–Cauchy identity, named after Jacques Philippe Marie Binet and Augustin-Louis Cauchy, states that $\left(\sum_{i=1}^n a_i c_i\right) \left(\sum_{j=1}^n b_j d_j\right) = \left(\sum_{i=1}^n a_i d_i\right) \left(\sum_{j=1}^n b_j c_j\right) + \sum_{1\le i < j \le n} (a_i b_j - a_j b_i ) (c_i d_j - c_j d_i )$ for every choice of real or complex numbers (or more generally, elements of a commutative ring). Setting a_{i} = c_{i} and b_{j} = d_{j}, it gives Lagrange's identity, which is a stronger version of the Cauchy–Schwarz inequality for the Euclidean space $\R^n$. The Binet-Cauchy identity is a special case of the Cauchy–Binet formula for matrix determinants.

== The Binet–Cauchy identity and exterior algebra ==
When n = 3, the first and second terms on the right hand side become the squared magnitudes of dot and cross products respectively; in n dimensions these become the magnitudes of the dot and wedge products. We may write it $(a \cdot c)(b \cdot d) = (a \cdot d)(b \cdot c) + (a \wedge b) \cdot (c \wedge d)$ where a, b, c, and d are vectors. It may also be written as a formula giving the dot product of two wedge products, as $(a \wedge b) \cdot (c \wedge d) = (a \cdot c)(b \cdot d) - (a \cdot d)(b \cdot c)\,,$ which can be written as $(a \times b) \cdot (c \times d) = (a \cdot c)(b \cdot d) - (a \cdot d)(b \cdot c)$ in the n = 3 case.

In the special case a = c and b = d, the formula yields $|a \wedge b|^2 = |a|^2|b|^2 - |a \cdot b|^2.$

When both a and b are unit vectors, we obtain the usual relation $\sin^2 \phi = 1 - \cos^2 \phi$ where φ is the angle between the vectors.

This is a special case of the Inner product on the exterior algebra of a vector space, which is defined on wedge-decomposable elements as the Gram determinant of their components.

== Einstein notation ==
A relationship between the Levi–Cevita symbols and the generalized Kronecker delta is $\frac{1}{k!}\varepsilon^{\lambda_1\cdots\lambda_k\mu_{k+1}\cdots\mu_{n}} \varepsilon_{\lambda_1\cdots\lambda_k\nu_{k+1}\cdots\nu_{n}} = \delta^{\mu_{k+1}\cdots\mu_{n}}_{\nu_{k+1}\cdots\nu_{n}}\,.$

The $(a \wedge b) \cdot (c \wedge d) = (a \cdot c)(b \cdot d) - (a \cdot d)(b \cdot c)$ form of the Binet–Cauchy identity can be written as $\frac{1}{(n-2)!}\left(\varepsilon^{\mu_1\cdots\mu_{n-2}\alpha\beta} ~ a_{\alpha} ~ b_{\beta} \right)\left( \varepsilon_{\mu_1\cdots\mu_{n-2}\gamma\delta} ~ c^{\gamma} ~ d^{\delta}\right) = \delta^{\alpha\beta}_{\gamma\delta} ~ a_{\alpha} ~ b_{\beta} ~ c^{\gamma} ~ d^{\delta}\,.$

== Proof ==
Expanding the last term,
$$\begin{align}
&\sum_{1\le i < j \le n} (a_i b_j - a_j b_i ) (c_i d_j - c_j d_i ) \\
={}&{}
\sum_{1\le i < j \le n} (a_i c_i b_j d_j + a_j c_j b_i d_i)
+ \sum_{i=1}^n a_i c_i b_i d_i
- \sum_{1\le i < j \le n} (a_i d_i b_j c_j + a_j d_j b_i c_i)
- \sum_{i=1}^n a_i d_i b_i c_i
\end{align}$$
where the second and fourth terms are the same and artificially added to complete the sums as follows: $= \sum_{i=1}^n \sum_{j=1}^n a_i c_i b_j d_j - \sum_{i=1}^n \sum_{j=1}^n a_i d_i b_j c_j.$

This completes the proof after factoring out the terms indexed by i.

== Generalization ==
A general form, also known as the Cauchy–Binet formula, states the following: Suppose A is an m×n matrix and B is an n×m matrix. If S is a subset of {1, ..., n} with m elements, we write A_{S} for the m×m matrix whose columns are those columns of A that have indices from S. Similarly, we write B_{S} for the m×m matrix whose rows are those rows of B that have indices from S. Then the determinant of the matrix product of A and B satisfies the identity $\det(AB) = \sum_{ S\subset\{1,\ldots,n\} \atop |S| = m} \det(A_S)\det(B_S),$ where the sum extends over all possible subsets S of {1, ..., n} with m elements.

We get the original identity as special case by setting
$$A = \begin{pmatrix}a_1&\dots&a_n\\b_1&\dots& b_n\end{pmatrix},\quad
B = \begin{pmatrix}c_1&d_1\\\vdots&\vdots\\c_n&d_n\end{pmatrix}.$$
