= Degen's eight-square identity =

In mathematics, Degen's eight-square identity establishes that the product of two numbers, each of which is a sum of eight squares, is itself the sum of eight squares. Namely:
$$\begin{align}
& \left(a_1^2+a_2^2+a_3^2+a_4^2+a_5^2+a_6^2+a_7^2+a_8^2\right)\left(b_1^2+b_2^2+b_3^2+b_4^2+b_5^2+b_6^2+b_7^2+b_8^2\right) = \\[1ex]
& \quad \left(a_1 b_1 - a_2 b_2 - a_3 b_3 - a_4 b_4 - a_5 b_5 - a_6 b_6 - a_7 b_7 - a_8 b_8\right)^2+ \\
& \quad \left(a_1 b_2 + a_2 b_1 + a_3 b_4 - a_4 b_3 + a_5 b_6 - a_6 b_5 - a_7 b_8 + a_8 b_7\right)^2+ \\
& \quad \left(a_1 b_3 - a_2 b_4 + a_3 b_1 + a_4 b_2 + a_5 b_7 + a_6 b_8 - a_7 b_5 - a_8 b_6\right)^2+ \\
& \quad \left(a_1 b_4 + a_2 b_3 - a_3 b_2 + a_4 b_1 + a_5 b_8 - a_6 b_7 + a_7 b_6 - a_8 b_5\right)^2+ \\
& \quad \left(a_1 b_5 - a_2 b_6 - a_3 b_7 - a_4 b_8 + a_5 b_1 + a_6 b_2 + a_7 b_3 + a_8 b_4\right)^2+ \\
& \quad \left(a_1 b_6 + a_2 b_5 - a_3 b_8 + a_4 b_7 - a_5 b_2 + a_6 b_1 - a_7 b_4 + a_8 b_3\right)^2+ \\
& \quad \left(a_1 b_7 + a_2 b_8 + a_3 b_5 - a_4 b_6 - a_5 b_3 + a_6 b_4 + a_7 b_1 - a_8 b_2\right)^2+ \\
& \quad \left(a_1 b_8 - a_2 b_7 + a_3 b_6 + a_4 b_5 - a_5 b_4 - a_6 b_3 + a_7 b_2 + a_8 b_1\right)^2
\end{align}$$

First discovered by Carl Ferdinand Degen around 1818, the identity was independently rediscovered by John Thomas Graves (1843) and Arthur Cayley (1845). The latter two derived it while working on an extension of quaternions called octonions. In algebraic terms the identity means that the norm of product of two octonions equals the product of their norms: $\left\|ab\right\| = \left\|a\right\| \left\|b\right\|$. Similar statements are true for quaternions (Euler's four-square identity), complex numbers (the Brahmagupta–Fibonacci two-square identity) and real numbers. In 1898 Adolf Hurwitz proved that there is no similar bilinear identity for 16 squares (sedenions) or any other number of squares except for 1,2,4, and 8. However, in the 1960s, H. Zassenhaus, W. Eichhorn, and A. Pfister (independently) showed there can be a non-bilinear identity for 16 squares.

Note that each quadrant reduces to a version of Euler's four-square identity:
$$\begin{align}
&\left(a_1^2+a_2^2+a_3^2+a_4^2\right)\left(b_1^2+b_2^2+b_3^2+b_4^2\right) = \\
& \quad \left(a_1b_1 - a_2b_2 - a_3b_3 - a_4b_4\right)^2+ \\
& \quad \left(a_1b_2 + a_2b_1 + a_3b_4 - a_4b_3\right)^2+ \\
& \quad \left(a_1b_3 - a_2b_4 + a_3b_1 + a_4b_2\right)^2+ \\
& \quad \left(a_1b_4 + a_2b_3 - a_3b_2 + a_4b_1\right)^2
\end{align}$$

and similarly for the other three quadrants.

Comment: The proof of the eight-square identity is by algebraic evaluation. The eight-square identity can be written in the form of a product of two inner products of 8-dimensional vectors, yielding again an inner product of 8-dimensional vectors: (a·a)(b·b) = (a×b)·(a×b). This defines the octonion multiplication rule a×b, which reflects Degen's 8-square identity and the mathematics of octonions.

By Pfister's theorem, a different sort of eight-square identity can be given where the $z_i$, introduced below, are non-bilinear and merely rational functions of the $x_i, y_i$. Thus,
$$\left(x_1^2+x_2^2+x_3^2+x_4^2+x_5^2+x_6^2+x_7^2+x_8^2\right) \left(y_1^2+y_2^2+y_3^2+y_4^2+y_5^2+y_6^2+y_7^2+y_8^2\right) = z_1^2+z_2^2+z_3^2+z_4^2+z_5^2+z_6^2+z_7^2+z_8^2$$

where,
$$\begin{align}
z_1 &= x_1 y_1 - x_2 y_2 - x_3 y_3 - x_4 y_4 + u_1 y_5 - u_2 y_6 - u_3 y_7 - u_4 y_8 \\
z_2 &= x_2 y_1 + x_1 y_2 + x_4 y_3 - x_3 y_4 + u_2 y_5 + u_1 y_6 + u_4 y_7 - u_3 y_8 \\
z_3 &= x_3 y_1 - x_4 y_2 + x_1 y_3 + x_2 y_4 + u_3 y_5 - u_4 y_6 + u_1 y_7 + u_2 y_8 \\
z_4 &= x_4 y_1 + x_3 y_2 - x_2 y_3 + x_1 y_4 + u_4 y_5 + u_3 y_6 - u_2 y_7 + u_1 y_8 \\
z_5 &= x_5 y_1 - x_6 y_2 - x_7 y_3 - x_8 y_4 + x_1 y_5 - x_2 y_6 - x_3 y_7 - x_4 y_8 \\
z_6 &= x_6 y_1 + x_5 y_2 + x_8 y_3 - x_7 y_4 + x_2 y_5 + x_1 y_6 + x_4 y_7 - x_3 y_8 \\
z_7 &= x_7 y_1 - x_8 y_2 + x_5 y_3 + x_6 y_4 + x_3 y_5 - x_4 y_6 + x_1 y_7 + x_2 y_8 \\
z_8 &= x_8 y_1 + x_7 y_2 - x_6 y_3 + x_5 y_4 + x_4 y_5 + x_3 y_6 - x_2 y_7 + x_1 y_8
\end{align}$$

and,

$$\begin{align}
u_1 &= \frac{(ax_1^2+x_2^2+x_3^2+x_4^2)x_5 - 2x_1(bx_1 x_5 + x_2 x_6+ x_3 x_7+ x_4 x_8)}{c} \\
u_2 &= \frac{(x_1^2+ax_2^2+x_3^2+x_4^2)x_6 - 2x_2(x_1 x_5 + bx_2 x_6+ x_3 x_7+ x_4 x_8)}{c} \\
u_3 &= \frac{(x_1^2+x_2^2+ax_3^2+x_4^2)x_7 - 2x_3(x_1 x_5 + x_2 x_6+ bx_3 x_7+ x_4 x_8)}{c} \\
u_4 &= \frac{(x_1^2+x_2^2+x_3^2+ax_4^2)x_8 - 2x_4(x_1 x_5 + x_2 x_6+ x_3 x_7+ bx_4 x_8)}{c}
\end{align}$$

with,
$$a=-1,\;\; b=0,\;\; c=x_1^2+x_2^2+x_3^2+x_4^2$$

Incidentally, the $u_i$ obey the identity,
$$u_1^2+u_2^2+u_3^2+u_4^2 = x_5^2+x_6^2+x_7^2+x_8^2$$

== See also ==
- Pfister's sixteen-square identity
- Cayley–Dickson construction
- Hypercomplex number
- Latin square
