= Vector fields on spheres =

How many linearly independent smooth nowhere-zero vector fields can be on an n-sphere

In mathematics, the discussion of vector fields on spheres was a classical problem of differential topology, beginning with the hairy ball theorem, and early work on the classification of division algebras.

Specifically, the question is how many linearly independent smooth nowhere-zero vector fields can be constructed on a sphere in $n$-dimensional Euclidean space. A definitive answer was provided in 1962 by Frank Adams. It was already known, by direct construction using Clifford algebras, that if $\rho(n)$ is the Radon-Hurwitz number of the n-sphere (definition below), then there were at least $\rho(n)-1$ such fields. Adams applied homotopy theory and topological K-theory to prove that no more independent vector fields could be found. Hence $\rho(n)-1$ is the exact number of pointwise linearly independent vector fields that exist on an ($n-1$)-dimensional sphere.

== Technical details ==
In detail, the question applies to the 'round spheres' and to their tangent bundles: in fact since all exotic spheres have isomorphic tangent bundles, the Radon–Hurwitz numbers $\rho(n)$ determine the maximum number of linearly independent sections of the tangent bundle of any homotopy sphere. The case of $n$ odd is taken care of by the Poincaré–Hopf index theorem (see hairy ball theorem), so the case $n$ even is an extension of that. Adams showed that the maximum number of continuous (smooth would be no different here) pointwise linearly-independent vector fields on the ($n-1$)-sphere is exactly $\rho(n)-1$.

The construction of the fields is related to the real Clifford algebras, which is a theory with a periodicity modulo 8 that also shows up here. By the Gram–Schmidt process, it is the same to ask for (pointwise) linear independence or fields that give an orthonormal basis at each point.

== Radon–Hurwitz numbers ==
The Radon–Hurwitz numbers $\rho(n)$ occur in earlier work of Johann Radon (1922) and Adolf Hurwitz (1923) on the Hurwitz problem on quadratic forms. When we write

$$n = (2 a + 1) 2^{4d + c},$$

where $a,d,c$ are all integers and $0 \leq c < 4$, then

$$\rho(n)=2^c+8d$$.

If $n$ is odd, then $c=d=0$ and $\rho(n) = 1$. The first few values of $\rho(2n)$ are (from (sequence A053381 in the OEIS)):

2, 4, 2, 8, 2, 4, 2, 9, 2, 4, 2, 8, 2, 4, 2, 10, ...

These numbers occur also in other, related areas. In matrix theory, the Radon–Hurwitz number counts the maximum size of a linear subspace of the real $n\times n$ matrices, for which each non-zero matrix is a similarity transformation, i.e. a product of an orthogonal matrix and a scalar matrix. In quadratic forms, the Hurwitz problem asks for multiplicative identities between quadratic forms. The classical results were revisited in 1952 by Beno Eckmann. They are now applied in areas including coding theory and theoretical physics.
