= Arthur Buchheim =

Arthur Buchheim (1859-1888) was a British mathematician.

His father Carl Adolf Buchheim was professor of German language at King's College London. After attending the City of London School, Arthur Buchheim obtained an open scholarship at New College, Oxford, where he was the favorite student of Henry John Stephen Smith. He then studied at the University of Leipzig as a student of Felix Klein. Eventually, he became mathematical master at the Manchester Grammar School.

Buchheim wrote several papers of which some deal with universal algebra. For instance, his work on William Kingdon Clifford's biquaternions and Hermann Grassmann's exterior algebra which he applied to screw theory and non-Euclidean geometry, was cited by Alfred North Whitehead (1898), as well as in Klein's encyclopedia by Élie Cartan (1908) and in more detail by Hermann Rothe (1916). He was also concerned with the matrix theory of Arthur Cayley and James Joseph Sylvester.

== Works (selection) ==
- Buchheim, A. (1883). "On the theory of screws in elliptic space". Proceedings of the London Mathematical Society. s1-15 (1): 83–98. doi:10.1112/plms/s1-15.1.83.
- Buchheim, A. (1884). "On the Theory of Matrices". Proceedings of the London Mathematical Society. s1-16 (1): 63–82. doi:10.1112/plms/s1-16.1.63.
- Buchheim, A. (1885). "A memoir on biquaternions". American Journal of Mathematics. 7 (4): 293–326. doi:10.2307/2369176. JSTOR 2369176.
