= Tokiko Shimizu =

Bank of Japan executive

Tokiko Shimizu (清水 季子, Shimizu Tokiko) is a Japanese banker. In 2020, she was appointed an executive director at the Bank of Japan, becoming the first woman to hold such a position.

== Early life ==
Shimizu was born in Tokyo in 1965. She attended a University of Tsukuba affiliated high school, but chose to enter the Faculty of Engineering at the University of Tokyo to study urban engineering. She graduated from the University of Tokyo in 1987, having completed a bachelor's degree in urban engineering. She also holds a master's degree in international policy studies from Stanford University.

Shimizu played tennis from junior high school until University.

== Banking career ==
Shimizu joined the Bank of Japan in 1987, working in foreign exchange operations for 14 years, and also in the financial markets division. In 2010, she was appointed chief of the Takamatsu branch, becoming the first woman branch chief at the bank.

From 2016 to 2018 she was the general manager of the Bank of Japan's Chief Representative Office for Europe located in the City of London.

In May 2020 she started a four-year term as executive director at the bank. She will also continue as the head of the bank's Nagoya branch, a position she has held since 2018.

== Career after the Bank of Japan ==
In 2024, after her four-year term finished, Shimizu left the bank and joined Toyota Automatic Loom Co., Ltd as an independent external director. She officially joined the company from June 11, 2024.

== Recognitions ==
Forbes ranked Shimizu as the 56th most powerful woman in the world in 2023.
