= Hideo Shimizu =

Japanese mathematician

Hideo Shimizu (清水 英男) (fl. 1963) is a Japanese mathematician who introduced Shimizu L-functions.
