= Jules Hoüel =

French mathematician (1823–1886)

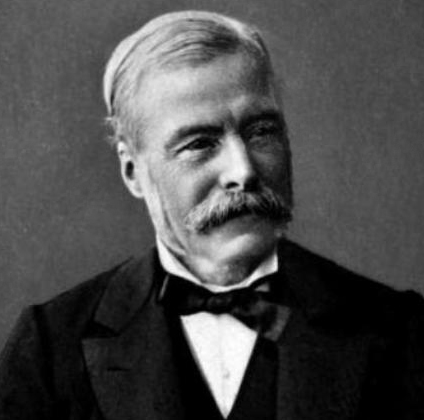
- Born: 7 April 1823; Thaon, France
- Died: 14 June 1886 (aged 63); Périers, France
- Education: École Normale Supérieure
- Known for: Lobachevski & Bolyai translations Quaternion textbook
- Scientific career
- Fields: Mathematics
- Workplaces: Bourges, Bordeaux; Pau, Pyrenees-Atlantiques; Alencon, Caen
- Thesis: Sur l'intégration des équations différentielles dans les problèmes de mécanique (1855)
- Doctoral students: Charles-Ange Laisant

Guillaume-Jules Hoüel (7 April 1823 – 14 June 1886) was a French mathematician. He entered the École Normale Supérieure in 1843 and received his doctoral degree in 1855 from the Sorbonne. He was sought by Urbain Le Verrier at the Paris Observatory, but chose instead to return to Thaon to study there. In 1859 he began to teach at Bordeaux.

In 1863 Hoüel expressed his doubts about the verifiability of the parallel postulate of Euclid.

In 1867 Hoüel produced French translations of two key publications of non-Euclidean geometry: Lobachevski's Geometrical Studies on the Theory of Parallels and Bolyai's Science of Absolute Space.

Hoüel published a four volume work titled Théorie Élémentaire des Quantités Complexes. Volume four, published in 1874, began with a discussion of properties of algebraic operations (commutativity, associativity, distribution, and inverses) and used the algebra of quaternions and versors to describe spherical trigonometry. However, in 1890 P. G. Tait revealed his dissatisfaction with Hoüel's changes in notation with text that Tait had given for Hoüel's use. Tait wrote:

The earliest offender in this class was the late M. Hoüel who, while availing himself of my permission to reproduce, in his Théorie Élémentaire des Quantités Complexes, large parts of this volume, made his pages absolutely repulsive by introducing fancied improvements in the notation.

In 1876 Hoüel reviewed a Russian language quaternion textbook written by Romer (1868)
