= Hurwitz's theorem (composition algebras) =

Non-associative algebras with positive-definite quadratic form

In mathematics, Hurwitz's theorem is a theorem of Adolf Hurwitz, published posthumously in 1923, solving the Hurwitz problem for finite-dimensional unital real non-associative algebras endowed with a nondegenerate positive-definite quadratic form. The theorem states that if the quadratic form defines a homomorphism into the positive real numbers on the non-zero part of the algebra, then the algebra must be isomorphic to the real numbers, the complex numbers, the quaternions, or the octonions, and that there are no other possibilities. Such algebras, sometimes called Hurwitz algebras, are examples of composition algebras.

The theory of composition algebras has subsequently been generalized to arbitrary quadratic forms and arbitrary fields. Hurwitz's theorem implies that multiplicative formulas for sums of squares can only occur in 1, 2, 4 and 8 dimensions, a result originally proved by Hurwitz in 1898. It is a special case of the Hurwitz problem, solved also in Radon (1922). Subsequent proofs of the restrictions on the dimension have been given by Eckmann (1943) using the representation theory of finite groups and by Lee (1948) and Chevalley (1954) using Clifford algebras. Hurwitz's theorem has been applied in algebraic topology to problems on vector fields on spheres and the homotopy groups of the classical groups and in quantum mechanics to the classification of simple Jordan algebras.

== Euclidean Hurwitz algebras ==
=== Definition ===
A Hurwitz algebra or composition algebra is a finite-dimensional not necessarily associative algebra A with identity endowed with a nondegenerate quadratic form q such that q(a b) = q(a) q(b). If the underlying coefficient field is the reals and q is positive-definite, so that (a, b) = 1/2[q(a + b) − q(a) − q(b)] is an inner product, then A is called a Euclidean Hurwitz algebra or (finite-dimensional) normed division algebra.

If A is a Euclidean Hurwitz algebra and a is in A, define the involution and right and left multiplication operators by

$$a^* = -a + 2(a,1)1,\quad L(a)b = ab,\quad R(a)b = ba.$$

Evidently the involution has period two and preserves the inner product and norm. These operators have the following properties:

- the involution is an antiautomorphism, i.e. (ab)* = b*a*
- aa* = ‖a‖^{2} 1 = a*a
- L(a*) = L(a)*, R(a*) = R(a)*, so that the involution on the algebra corresponds to taking adjoints
- Re (ab) = Re (ba) if Re x = (x + x*)/2 = (x, 1)1
- Re (ab)c = Re a(bc)
- L(a^{2}) = L(a)^{2}, R(a^{2}) = R(a)^{2}, so that A is an alternative algebra.

These properties are proved starting from the polarized version of the identity (ab, ab) = (a, a)(b, b):

$$\displaystyle{2(a,b)(c,d) = (ac,bd) + (ad,bc).}$$

Setting b = 1 or d = 1 yields L(a*) = L(a)* and R(c*) = R(c)*.

Hence Re(ab) = (ab, 1)1 = (a, b*)1 = (ba, 1)1 = Re(ba).

Similarly Re (ab)c = ((ab)c,1)1 = (ab, c*)1 = (b, a* c*)1 = (bc,a*)1 = (a(bc),1)1 = Re a(bc).

Hence ((ab)*, c) = (ab, c*) = (b, a*c*) = (1, b*(a*c*)) = (1, (b*a*)c*) = (b*a*, c), so that (ab)* = b*a*.

By the polarized identity ‖a‖^{2} (c, d) = (ac, ad) = (a* (ac), d) so L(a*) L(a) = L(‖a‖^{2}). Applied to 1 this gives a*a = ‖a‖^{2} 1. Replacing a by a* gives the other identity.

Substituting the formula for a* in L(a*) L(a) = L(a*a) gives L(a)^{2} = L(a^{2}). The formula R(a^{2}) = R(a)^{2} is proved analogously.

=== Classification ===
It is routine to check that the real numbers R, the complex numbers C and the quaternions H are examples of associative Euclidean Hurwitz algebras with their standard norms and involutions. There are moreover natural inclusions R ⊂ C ⊂ H.

Analysing such an inclusion leads to the Cayley–Dickson construction, formalized by A.A. Albert. Let A be a Euclidean Hurwitz algebra and B a proper unital subalgebra, so a Euclidean Hurwitz algebra in its own right. Pick a unit vector j in A orthogonal to B. Since (j, 1) = 0, it follows that j* = −j and hence j^{2} = −1. Let C be subalgebra generated by B and j. It is unital and is again a Euclidean Hurwitz algebra. It satisfies the following Cayley–Dickson multiplication laws:

$$\displaystyle{C=B\oplus Bj, \,\,\, (a+bj)^*=a^* - bj, \,\,\, (a+bj)(c+dj)=(ac -d^*b) +(bc^*+da)j.}$$

B and Bj are orthogonal, since j is orthogonal to B. If a is in B, then j a = a* j, since by orthogonal 0 = 2(j, a*) = ja − a*j. The formula for the involution follows. To show that B ⊕ B j is closed under multiplication Bj = jB. Since Bj is orthogonal to 1, (bj)* = −bj.

- b(cj) = (cb)j since (b, j) = 0 so that, for x in A, (b(cj), x) = (b(jx), j(cj)) = −(b(jx), c*) = −(cb, (jx)*) = −((cb)j, x*) = ((cb)j, x).
- (jc)b = j(bc) taking adjoints above.
- (bj)(cj) = −c*b since (b, cj) = 0, so that, for x in A, ((bj)(cj), x) = −((cj)x*, bj) = (bx*, (cj)j) = −(c*b, x).

Imposing the multiplicativity of the norm on C for a + bj and c + dj gives:

$$\displaystyle{(\|a\|^2 + \|b\|^2)(\|c\|^2 + \|d\|^2) = \|ac - d^*b\|^2 + \|bc^* + da\|^2,}$$

which leads to

$$\displaystyle{(ac,d^*b) = (bc^*,da).}$$

Hence d(ac) = (da)c, so that B must be associative.

This analysis applies to the inclusion of R in C and C in H. Taking O = H ⊕ H with the product and inner product above gives a noncommutative nonassociative algebra generated by J = (0, 1). This recovers the usual definition of the octonions or Cayley numbers. If A is a Euclidean algebra, it must contain R. If it is strictly larger than R, the argument above shows that it contains C. If it is larger than C, it contains H. If it is larger still, it must contain O. But there the process must stop, because O is not associative. In fact H is not commutative and a(bj) = (ba)j ≠ (ab)j in O.

Theorem. The only Euclidean Hurwitz algebras are the real numbers, the complex numbers, the quaternions and the octonions.

== Other proofs ==
The proofs of Lee (1948) and Chevalley (1954) use Clifford algebras to show that the dimension N of A must be 1, 2, 4 or 8. In fact the operators L(a) with (a, 1) = 0 satisfy L(a)^{2} = −‖a‖^{2} and so form a real Clifford algebra. If a is a unit vector, then L(a) is skew-adjoint with square −I. So N must be either even or 1 (in which case A contains no unit vectors orthogonal to 1). The real Clifford algebra and its complexification act on the complexification of A, an N-dimensional complex space. If N is even, N − 1 is odd, so the Clifford algebra has exactly two complex irreducible representations of dimension 2^{N/2 − 1}. So this power of 2 must divide N. It is easy to see that this implies N can only be 1, 2, 4 or 8.

The proof of Eckmann (1943) uses the representation theory of finite groups, or the projective representation theory of elementary abelian 2-groups, known to be equivalent to the representation theory of real Clifford algebras. Indeed, taking an orthonormal basis e_{i} of the orthogonal complement of 1 gives rise to operators U_{i} = L(e_{i}) satisfying

$$U_i^2 = -I,\quad U_i U_j = -U_j U_i \,\, (i \ne j).$$

This is a projective representation of a direct product of N − 1 groups of order 2. (N is assumed to be greater than 1.) The operators U_{i} by construction are skew-symmetric and orthogonal. In fact Eckmann constructed operators of this type in a slightly different but equivalent way. It is in fact the method originally followed in Hurwitz (1923). Assume that there is a composition law for two forms

$$\displaystyle{(x_1^2 + \cdots +x_N^2)(y_1^2 + \cdots + y_N^2) =z_1^2 + \cdots + z_N^2,}$$

where z_{i} is bilinear in x and y. Thus

$$\displaystyle{z_i=\sum_{j=1}^N a_{ij}(x)y_j}$$

where the matrix T(x) = (a_{ij}) is linear in x. The relations above are equivalent to

$$\displaystyle{T(x)T(x)^t=x_1^2 +\cdots + x_N^2.}$$

Writing

$$\displaystyle{T(x)=T_1x_1 + \cdots + T_Nx_N,}$$

the relations become

$$\displaystyle{T_iT^t_j+T_jT_i^t =2\delta_{ij}I.}$$

Now set V_{i} = (T_{N})^{t} T_{i}. Thus V_{N} = I and the V_{1}, ... , V_{N − 1} are skew-adjoint, orthogonal satisfying exactly the same relations as the U_{i}'s:

$$\displaystyle{V_i^2 = -I,\quad V_iV_j = -V_jV_i \,\, (i \ne j).}$$

Since V_{i} is an orthogonal matrix with square −I on a real vector space, N is even.

Let G be the finite group generated by elements v_{i} such that

$$\displaystyle{v_i^2 = \varepsilon,\quad v_iv_j = \varepsilon v_jv_i \,\, (i \ne j),}$$

where ε is central of order 2. The commutator subgroup [G, G] is just formed of 1 and ε. If N is odd this coincides with the center while if N is even the center has order 4 with extra elements γ = v_{1}...v_{N − 1} and εγ. If g in G is not in the center its conjugacy class is exactly g and εg. Thus there are 2^{N − 1} + 1 conjugacy classes for N odd and 2^{N − 1} + 2 for N even. G has |G / [G, G] | = 2^{N − 1} 1-dimensional complex representations. The total number of irreducible complex representations is the number of conjugacy classes. So since N is even, there are two further irreducible complex representations. Since the sum of the squares of the dimensions equals |G| and the dimensions divide |G|, the two irreducibles must have dimension 2^{(N − 2)/2}. When N is even, there are two and their dimension must divide the order of the group, so is a power of two, so they must both have dimension 2^{(N − 2)/2}. The space on which the V_{i}'s act can be complexified. It will have complex dimension N. It breaks up into some of complex irreducible representations of G, all having dimension 2^{(N − 2)/2}. In particular this dimension is ≤ N, so N is less than or equal to 8. If N = 6, the dimension is 4, which does not divide 6. So N can only be 1, 2, 4 or 8.

== Applications to Jordan algebras ==
Let A be a Euclidean Hurwitz algebra and let M_{n}(A) be the algebra of n-by-n matrices over A. It is a unital nonassociative algebra with an involution given by

$$\displaystyle{(x_{ij})^*=(x_{ji}^*).}$$

The trace Tr(X) is defined as the sum of the diagonal elements of X and the real-valued trace by Tr_{R}(X ) = Re Tr(X ). The real-valued trace satisfies:

$$\operatorname{Tr}_{\mathbf{R}} XY = \operatorname{Tr}_{\mathbf{R}} YX, \qquad \operatorname{Tr}_{\mathbf{R}} (XY)Z = \operatorname{Tr}_{\mathbf{R}} X(YZ).$$

These are immediate consequences of the known identities for n = 1.

In A define the associator by

$$\displaystyle{[a,b,c]=a(bc) - (ab)c.}$$

It is trilinear and vanishes identically if A is associative. Since A is an alternative algebra [a, a, b] = 0 and [b, a, a] = 0. Polarizing it follows that the associator is antisymmetric in its three entries. Furthermore, if a, b or c lie in R then [a, b, c] = 0. These facts imply that M_{3}(A) has certain commutation properties. In fact if X is a matrix in M_{3}(A) with real entries on the diagonal then

$$\displaystyle{[X,X^2] = aI,}$$

with a in A. In fact if Y = [X, X^{2}], then

$$\displaystyle{y_{ij} = \sum_{k,\ell} [x_{ik},x_{k\ell},x_{\ell j}].}$$

Since the diagonal entries of X are real, the off-diagonal entries of Y vanish. Each diagonal entry of Y is a sum of two associators involving only off diagonal terms of X. Since the associators are invariant under cyclic permutations, the diagonal entries of Y are all equal.

Let H_{n}(A) be the space of self-adjoint elements in M_{n}(A) with product X ∘Y = 1/2(X Y + Y X) and inner product (X, Y ) = Tr_{R}(X Y ).

Theorem. H_{n}(A) is a Euclidean Jordan algebra if A is associative (the real numbers, complex numbers or quaternions) and n ≥ 3 or if A is nonassociative (the octonions) and n = 3.

The exceptional Jordan algebra H_{3}(O) is called the Albert algebra after A.A. Albert.

To check that H_{n}(A) satisfies the axioms for a Euclidean Jordan algebra, the real trace defines a symmetric bilinear form with (X, X) = Σ ‖x_{ij}‖^{2}. So it is an inner product. It satisfies the associativity property (Z∘X, Y ) = (X, Z∘Y ) because of the properties of the real trace. The main axiom to check is the Jordan condition for the operators L(X) defined by L(X)Y = X ∘Y:

$$\displaystyle{[L(X),L(X^2)]=0.}$$

This is easy to check when A is associative, since M_{n}(A) is an associative algebra so a Jordan algebra with X ∘Y = 1/2(X Y + Y X). When A = O and n = 3 a special argument is required, one of the shortest being due to Freudenthal (1951).

In fact if T is in H_{3}(O) with Tr T = 0, then

$$\displaystyle{D(X) = TX -XT}$$

defines a skew-adjoint derivation of H_{3}(O). Indeed,

$$\operatorname{Tr}(T(X(X^2)) -T(X^2(X))) = \operatorname{Tr} T(aI) = \operatorname{Tr}(T)a=0,$$

so that

$$(D(X),X^2) = 0.$$

Polarizing yields:

$$(D(X),Y\circ Z) + (D(Y),Z\circ X) + (D(Z),X\circ Y) = 0.$$

Setting Z = 1 shows that D is skew-adjoint. The derivation property D(X ∘Y) = D(X)∘Y + X∘D(Y) follows by this and the associativity property of the inner product in the identity above.

With A and n as in the statement of the theorem, let K be the group of automorphisms of E = H_{n}(A) leaving invariant the inner product. It is a closed subgroup of O(E) so a compact Lie group. Its Lie algebra consists of skew-adjoint derivations. Freudenthal (1951) showed that given X in E there is an automorphism k in K such that k(X) is a diagonal matrix. (By self-adjointness the diagonal entries will be real.) Freudenthal's diagonalization theorem immediately implies the Jordan condition, since Jordan products by real diagonal matrices commute on M_{n}(A) for any non-associative algebra A.

To prove the diagonalization theorem, take X in E. By compactness k can be chosen in K minimizing the sums of the squares of the norms of the off-diagonal terms of k(X ). Since K preserves the sums of all the squares, this is equivalent to maximizing the sums of the squares of the norms of the diagonal terms of k(X ). Replacing X by k X, it can be assumed that the maximum is attained at X. Since the symmetric group S_{n}, acting by permuting the coordinates, lies in K, if X is not diagonal, it can be supposed that x_{12} and its adjoint x_{21} are non-zero. Let T be the skew-adjoint matrix with (2, 1) entry a, (1, 2) entry −a* and 0 elsewhere and let D be the derivation ad T of E. Let k_{t} = exp tD in K. Then only the first two diagonal entries in X(t) = k_{t}X differ from those of X. The diagonal entries are real. The derivative of x_{11}(t) at t = 0 is the (1, 1) coordinate of [T, X], i.e. a* x_{21} + x_{12} a = 2(x_{21}, a). This derivative is non-zero if a = x_{21}. On the other hand, the group k_{t} preserves the real-valued trace. Since it can only change x_{11} and x_{22}, it preserves their sum. However, on the line x + y = constant, x^{2} + y^{2} has no local maximum (only a global minimum), a contradiction. Hence X must be diagonal.

== See also ==
- Multiplicative quadratic form
- Radon–Hurwitz number
- Frobenius Theorem
