= Euler's four-square identity =

Product of sums of four squares expressed as a sum of four squares

In mathematics, Euler's four-square identity says that the product of two numbers, each of which is a sum of four squares, is itself a sum of four squares.

== Algebraic identity ==
For any pair of quadruples from a commutative ring, the following expressions are equal:

$$\begin{align}
& \left(a_1^2+a_2^2+a_3^2+a_4^2\right) \left(b_1^2+b_2^2+b_3^2+b_4^2\right) \\[3mu]
&\qquad = \left(a_1 b_1 - a_2 b_2 - a_3 b_3 - a_4 b_4\right)^2
+ \left(a_1 b_2 + a_2 b_1 + a_3 b_4 - a_4 b_3\right)^2 \\[3mu]
&\qquad\qquad+ \left(a_1 b_3 - a_2 b_4 + a_3 b_1 + a_4 b_2\right)^2
+ \left(a_1 b_4 + a_2 b_3 - a_3 b_2 + a_4 b_1\right)^2.
\end{align}$$

Euler wrote about this identity in a letter dated May 4, 1748 to Goldbach (but he used a different sign convention from the above). It can be verified with elementary algebra.

The identity was used by Lagrange to prove his four square theorem. More specifically, it implies that it is sufficient to prove the theorem for prime numbers, after which the more general theorem follows. The sign convention used above corresponds to the signs obtained by multiplying two quaternions. Other sign conventions can be obtained by changing any $a_k$ to $-a_k$, and/or any $b_k$ to $-b_k$.

If the $a_k$ and $b_k$ are real numbers, the identity expresses the fact that the absolute value of the product of two quaternions is equal to the product of their absolute values, in the same way that the Brahmagupta–Fibonacci two-square identity does for complex numbers. This property is the definitive feature of composition algebras.

Hurwitz's theorem states that an identity of form,

$$\left(a_1^2+a_2^2+a_3^2+\dots+a_n^2\right)\left(b_1^2+b_2^2+b_3^2+\dots+b_n^2\right) = c_1^2+c_2^2+c_3^2+ \dots + c_n^2$$

where the $c_i$ are bilinear functions of the $a_i$ and $b_i$ is possible only for n = 1, 2, 4, or 8.

=== Proof of the identity using quaternions ===
Comment: The proof of Euler's four-square identity is by simple algebraic evaluation. Quaternions derive from the four-square identity, which can be written as the product of two inner products of 4-dimensional vectors, yielding again an inner product of 4-dimensional vectors: (a·a)(b·b) = (a×b)·(a×b). This defines the quaternion multiplication rule a×b, which simply reflects Euler's identity, and some mathematics of quaternions. Quaternions are, so to say, the "square root" of the four-square identity. But let the proof go on:

Let $\alpha = a_1 + a_2 i + a_3 j + a_4 k$ and $\beta = b_1 + b_2 i + b_3 j + b_4 k$ be a pair of quaternions. Their quaternion conjugates are $\alpha^* = a_1 - a_2 i - a_3 j - a_4 k$ and $\beta^* = b_1 - b_2 i - b_3 j - b_4 k$. Then

$$A := \alpha \alpha^* = a_1^2 + a_2^2 + a_3^2 + a_4^2$$

and

$$B := \beta \beta^* = b_1^2 + b_2^2 + b_3^2 + b_4^2.$$

The product of these two is $A B = \alpha \alpha^* \beta \beta^*$, where $\beta \beta^*$ is a real number, so it can commute with the quaternion $\alpha^*$, yielding

$$A B = \alpha \beta \beta^* \alpha^*.$$

No parentheses are necessary above, because quaternions associate. The conjugate of a product is equal to the commuted product of the conjugates of the product's factors, so

$$A B = \alpha \beta (\alpha \beta)^* = \gamma \gamma^*$$

where $\gamma$ is the Hamilton product of $\alpha$ and $\beta$:

$$\begin{align}
\gamma &= \left( a_1 + \langle a_2, a_3, a_4 \rangle\right) \left(b_1 + \langle b_2, b_3, b_4 \rangle\right) \\[3mu]
& = a_1 b_1 + a_1 \langle b_2, \ b_3, \ b_4\rangle + \langle a_2, \ a_3, \ a_4\rangle b_1 + \langle a_2, \ a_3, \ a_4\rangle \langle b_2, \ b_3, \ b_4\rangle \\[3mu]
& = a_1 b_1 + \langle a_1 b_2, \ a_1 b_3, \ a_1 b_4\rangle + \langle a_2 b_1, \ a_3 b_1, \ a_4 b_1\rangle \\
&\qquad - \langle a_2,\  a_3, \ a_4\rangle \cdot \langle b_2, \ b_3, \ b_4\rangle + \langle a_2, \ a_3, \ a_4\rangle \times \langle b_2, \ b_3, \  b_4\rangle \\[3mu]
& = a_1 b_1 + \langle a_1 b_2 + a_2 b_1, \ a_1 b_3 + a_3 b_1, \ a_1 b_4 + a_4 b_1\rangle \\
&\qquad - a_2 b_2 - a_3 b_3 - a_4 b_4 + \langle a_3 b_4 - a_4 b_3, \ a_4 b_2 - a_2 b_4, \ a_2 b_3 - a_3 b_2\rangle \\[3mu]
& = (a_1 b_1 - a_2 b_2 - a_3 b_3 - a_4 b_4) \\
&\qquad + \langle a_1 b_2 + a_2 b_1 + a_3 b_4 - a_4 b_3, \ a_1 b_3 + a_3 b_1 + a_4 b_2 - a_2 b_4, \ a_1 b_4 + a_4 b_1 + a_2 b_3 - a_3 b_2\rangle \\[3mu]
\gamma &= (a_1 b_1 - a_2 b_2 - a_3 b_3 - a_4 b_4) + (a_1 b_2 + a_2 b_1 + a_3 b_4 - a_4 b_3) i \\
&\qquad + (a_1 b_3 + a_3 b_1 + a_4 b_2 - a_2 b_4) j + (a_1 b_4 + a_4 b_1 + a_2 b_3 - a_3 b_2) k.
\end{align}$$

Then

$$\begin{align}
\gamma^* &= (a_1 b_1 - a_2 b_2 - a_3 b_3 - a_4 b_4) - (a_1 b_2 + a_2 b_1 + a_3 b_4 - a_4 b_3) i \\
&\qquad - (a_1 b_3 + a_3 b_1 + a_4 b_2 - a_2 b_4) j - (a_1 b_4 + a_4 b_1 + a_2 b_3 - a_3 b_2) k .
\end{align}$$

If $\gamma = r + \vec u$ where $r$ is the scalar part and $\vec u = \langle u_1, u_2, u_3\rangle$ is the vector part, then $\gamma^* = r - \vec u$ so

$$\begin{align}
\gamma \gamma^* &= (r + \vec u) (r - \vec u) = r^2 - r \vec u + r \vec u - \vec u \vec u = r^2 + \vec u \cdot \vec u - \vec u \times \vec u \\
&= r^2 + \vec u \cdot \vec u = r^2 + u_1^2 + u_2^2 + u_3^2.
\end{align}$$

So,

$$\begin{align}
A B = \gamma \gamma^* &= (a_1 b_1 - a_2 b_2 - a_3 b_3 - a_4 b_4)^2 + (a_1 b_2 + a_2 b_1 + a_3 b_4 - a_4 b_3)^2 \\
&\qquad + (a_1 b_3 + a_3 b_1 + a_4 b_2 - a_2 b_4)^2 + (a_1 b_4 + a_4 b_1 + a_2 b_3 - a_3 b_2)^2.
\end{align}$$

== Pfister's identity ==
Pfister found another square identity for any even power:

If the $c_i$ are just rational functions of one set of variables, so that each $c_i$ has a denominator, then it is possible for all $n = 2^m$.

Thus, another four-square identity is as follows:
$$\begin{align}
&\left(a_1^2+a_2^2+a_3^2+a_4^2\right)\left(b_1^2+b_2^2+b_3^2+b_4^2\right) \\[5mu]
&\quad= \left(a_1 b_4 + a_2 b_3 + a_3 b_2 + a_4 b_1\right)^2 + \left(a_1 b_3 - a_2 b_4 + a_3 b_1 - a_4 b_2\right)^2 \\
&\quad\qquad+ \left(a_1 b_2 + a_2 b_1 + \frac{a_3 u_1}{b_1^2+b_2^2} - \frac{a_4 u_2}{b_1^2+b_2^2}\right)^2
+ \left(a_1 b_1 - a_2 b_2 - \frac{a_4 u_1}{b_1^2+b_2^2} - \frac{a_3 u_2}{b_1^2+b_2^2}\right)^2
\end{align}$$

where $u_1$ and $u_2$ are given by
$$\begin{align}
u_1 &= b_1^2 b_4 - 2 b_1 b_2 b_3 - b_2^2 b_4 \\
u_2 &= b_1^2 b_3 + 2 b_1 b_2 b_4 - b_2^2 b_3
\end{align}$$

Incidentally, the following identity is also true:

$$u_1^2+u_2^2 = \left(b_1^2+b_2^2\right)^2\left(b_3^2+b_4^2\right)$$

== See also ==
- Brahmagupta–Fibonacci identity (sums of two squares)
- Degen's eight-square identity
- Pfister's sixteen-square identity
- Latin square
- List of topics named after Leonhard Euler
