= Hermite reduction =

Concept in quadratic forms

In the theory of quadratic forms, a Hermite reduction of a real positive definite form is another real positive definite form integrally equivalent to it whose coefficients are reasonably small in the sense defined below.

== Definition ==
A positive definite form

$$Q(x)=\sum_{i=1}^n\sum_{j=1}^nQ_{ij}x_ix_j$$

on $\mathbb R^n$ is Hermite reduced if the following recursively defined condition is satisfied.

- $0<|Q_{11}|\le(4/3)^{(n-1)/2}\sqrt[n]{\det Q}$
- $2|Q_{1i}|\le|Q_{11}|\qquad(i=2,\dots,n)$
- The form $Q'(x_2,\dots,x_n)=Q_{11}Q(x)-(Q_{11}x_1+\cdots+Q_{1n}x_n)^2$ is a Hermite reduced form on $\mathbb R^{n-1}$

For every positive definite form $Q$ on $\mathbb R^n$, there exists a $\mathbb Z$-module isomorphism $U\colon\mathbb Z^n\to\mathbb Z^n$ and a Hermite reduced form $\tilde Q$ on $\mathbb R^n$ such that

$$Q\circ(U\otimes_{\mathbb Z}\mathbb R)=\tilde Q.$$

In matrix notation, for every real $n\times n$ positive definite matrix $Q$, there exists an integer $n\times n$ invertible matrix $U$ (so-called unimodular matrix) and an $n\times n$ Hermite reduced matrix $\tilde Q$ such that

$$U^TQU=\tilde Q.$$

Then $\tilde Q$ is called a Hermite reduction of $Q$.

Each real positive definite form has only a finite number of Hermite reductions; they are not unique in general.

== Application ==
The Hermite reduction of a binary or ternary positive definite form with integer coefficients with determinant 1 is simply the sum of squares. This is used in a proof of Legendre's three-square theorem: to show that an integer is a sum of squares of three integers it is sufficient to show that it can be represented by a ternary positive definite form with determinant 1.

== Historical note ==
The Hermite reduction is named after Charles Hermite.
