= Legendre's three-square theorem =

Says when a natural number is the sum of three squares of integers

In mathematics, Legendre's three-square theorem states that a natural number can be represented as the sum of three squares of integers

$$n = x^2 + y^2 + z^2$$

if and only if n is not of the form $n = 4^a(8b + 7)$ for nonnegative integers a and b.

Distances between vertices of a double unit cube are square roots of the first six natural numbers due to the Pythagorean theorem (√7 is not possible due to Legendre's three-square theorem)

The first numbers that cannot be expressed as the sum of three squares (i.e. numbers that can be expressed as $n = 4^a(8b + 7)$) are

7, 15, 23, 28, 31, 39, 47, 55, 60, 63, 71 ... (sequence A004215 in the OEIS).

a b	0	1	2
0	**7**	**28**	112
1	**15**	**60**	240
2	**23**	**92**	368
3	**31**	124	496
4	**39**	156	624
5	**47**	188	752
6	**55**	220	880
7	**63**	252	1008
8	**71**	284	1136
9	**79**	316	1264
10	**87**	348	1392
11	**95**	380	1520
12	103	412	1648
Unexpressible values up to 100 are in bold

== History ==
Pierre de Fermat gave a criterion for numbers of the form 8a + 1 and 8a + 3 to be sums of a square plus twice another square, but did not provide a proof. N. Beguelin noticed in 1774 that every positive integer which is neither of the form 8n + 7, nor of the form 4n, is the sum of three squares, but did not provide a satisfactory proof. In 1796 Gauss proved his Eureka theorem that every positive integer n is the sum of 3 triangular numbers; this is equivalent to the fact that 8n + 3 is a sum of three squares. In 1797 or 1798 A.-M. Legendre obtained the first proof of his 3 square theorem. In 1813, A. L. Cauchy noted that Legendre's theorem is equivalent to the statement in the introduction above. Previously, in 1801, Gauss had obtained a more general result, containing Legendre's theorem of 1797–8 as a corollary. In particular, Gauss counted the number of solutions of the expression of an integer as a sum of three squares, and this is a generalisation of yet another result of Legendre, whose proof is incomplete. This last fact appears to be the reason for later incorrect claims according to which Legendre's proof of the three-square theorem was defective and had to be completed by Gauss.

With Lagrange's four-square theorem and the two-square theorem of Girard, Fermat and Euler, the Waring's problem for k = 2 is entirely solved.

== Proofs ==
The "only if" of the theorem is simply because modulo 8, every square is congruent to 0, 1 or 4. There are several proofs of the converse (besides Legendre's proof). One of them is due to Dirichlet (in 1850), and has become classical. It requires three main lemmas:

- the quadratic reciprocity law,
- Dirichlet's theorem on arithmetic progressions, and
- the equivalence class of the trivial ternary quadratic form.

== Relationship to the four-square theorem ==
This theorem can be used to prove Lagrange's four-square theorem, which states that all natural numbers can be written as a sum of four squares. Gauss pointed out that the four squares theorem follows easily from the fact that any positive integer that is 1 or 2 mod 4 is a sum of 3 squares, because any positive integer not divisible by 4 can be reduced to this form by subtracting 0 or 1 from it. However, proving the three-square theorem is considerably more difficult than a direct proof of the four-square theorem that does not use the three-square theorem. Indeed, the four-square theorem was proved earlier, in 1770.

== See also ==
- Fermat's two-square theorem
- Legendre's equation
- Sum of squares function
- Sum of two squares theorem
