= Jacobi's four-square theorem =

How many ways a positive integer can be represented as the sum of four squares

In number theory, Jacobi's four-square theorem gives a formula for the number of ways that a given positive integer n can be represented as the sum of four squares (of integers).

== History ==
The theorem was proved in 1834 by Carl Gustav Jakob Jacobi.

== Theorem ==
Two representations are considered different if their terms are in different order or if the integer being squared (not just the square) is different; to illustrate, these are three of the eight different ways to represent 1:

$$\begin{align}
1^2 &+ 0^2 + 0^2 + 0^2 \\
0^2 &+ 1^2 + 0^2 + 0^2 \\
(-1)^2 &+ 0^2 + 0^2 + 0^2.
\end{align}$$

The number of ways to represent n as the sum of four squares is eight times the sum of the divisors of n if n is odd and 24 times the sum of the odd divisors of n if n is even (see divisor function), i.e.

$$r_4(n) = \begin{cases}
\displaystyle 8\sum_{m|n} m & \text{if } n \text{ is odd}, \\[12pt]
\displaystyle 24 \sum_{{m|n} \atop {m\text{ odd}}} m & \text{if } n \text{ is even}.
\end{cases}$$

Equivalently, it is eight times the sum of all its divisors which are not divisible by 4, i.e.

$$r_4(n) = 8 \sum_{{m \mid n,} \atop {4 \nmid m}} m.$$

An immediate consequence is $r_4(2n) = r_4(8n)$; for odd $n$, $r_4(2 \cdot 4^a n) = r_4(2 n)$.

We may also write this as

$$r_4(n) = 8 \, \sigma(n) -32 \, \sigma(n/4)$$

where the second term is to be taken as zero if n is not divisible by 4. In particular, for a prime number p we have the explicit formula r_{4}(p) = 8(p + 1).

Some values of r_{4}(n) occur infinitely often as r_{4}(n) = r_{4}(2^{m}n) whenever n is even. The values of r_{4}(n) can be arbitrarily large: indeed, r_{4}(n) is infinitely often larger than $8\sqrt{\log n}.$

== Proof ==
The theorem can be proved by elementary means starting with the Jacobi triple product.

The proof shows that the Theta series for the lattice Z^{4} is a modular form of a certain level, and hence equals a linear combination of Eisenstein series.

== Values ==
The first few values of the formula are as follows:

$n$	0	1	2	3	4	5	6	7	8	9	10
$r_4(n)$	1	8	24	32	24	48	96	64	24	104	144

Additional values may be seen at sequence A000118 in the Online Encyclopedia of Integer Sequences (OEIS).

== Generalizations ==
The number of representations of n as the sum of k squares is known as the sum of squares function. Jacobi's four-square theorem gives an analytic formula for the case k = 4.

== See also ==
- Lagrange's four-square theorem
- Lambert series
- Sum of squares function
