= Table of Gaussian integer factorizations =

Mathematical table

A Gaussian integer is either the zero, one of the four units (±1, ±i), a Gaussian prime or composite. The article is a table of Gaussian Integers x + iy followed either by an explicit factorization or followed by the label (p) if the integer is a Gaussian prime. The factorizations take the form of an optional unit multiplied by integer powers of Gaussian primes.

Note that there are rational primes which are not Gaussian primes. A simple example is the rational prime 5, which is factored as 5=(2+i)(2−i) in the table, and therefore not a Gaussian prime.

== Conventions ==
The second column of the table contains only integers in the first quadrant, which means the real part x is positive and the imaginary part y is non-negative. The table might have been further reduced to the integers in the first octant of the complex plane using the symmetry y + ix =i (x − iy).

The factorizations are often not unique in the sense that the unit could be absorbed into any other factor with exponent equal to one. The entry 4+2i = −i(1+i)^{2}(2+i), for example, could also be written as 4+2i= (1+i)^{2}(1−2i). The entries in the table resolve this ambiguity by the following convention: the factors are primes in the right complex half plane with absolute value of the real part larger than or equal to the absolute value of the imaginary part.

The entries are sorted according to increasing norm x^{2} + y^{2} (sequence A001481 in the OEIS). The table is complete up to the maximum norm at the end of the table in the sense that each composite or prime in the first quadrant appears in the second column.

Gaussian primes occur only for a subset of norms, detailed in sequence OEIS: A055025. This here is a composition of sequences OEIS: A103431 and OEIS: A103432.

== Factorizations ==
Norm 1–250
Norm	Integer	Factorization
2	1+i	(p)
4	2	−i·(1+i)^{2}
5	2+i 1+2i	(p) (p)
8	2+2i	−i·(1+i)^{3}
9	3	(p)
10	1+3i 3+i	(1+i)·(2+i) (1+i)·(2−i)
13	3+2i 2+3i	(p) (p)
16	4	−(1+i)^{4}
17	1+4i 4+i	(p) (p)
18	3+3i	(1+i)·3
20	2+4i 4+2i	(1+i)^{2}·(2−i) −i·(1+i)^{2}·(2+i)
25	3+4i 4+3i 5	(2+i)^{2} i·(2−i)^{2} (2+i)·(2−i)
26	1+5i 5+i	(1+i)·(3+2i) (1+i)·(3−2i)
29	2+5i 5+2i	(p) (p)
32	4+4i	−(1+i)^{5}
34	3+5i 5+3i	(1+i)·(4+i) (1+i)·(4−i)
36	6	−i·(1+i)^{2}·3
37	1+6i 6+i	(p) (p)
40	2+6i 6+2i	−i·(1+i)^{3}·(2+i) −i·(1+i)^{3}·(2−i)
41	4+5i 5+4i	(p) (p)
45	3+6i 6+3i	i·(2−i)·3 (2+i)·3
49	7	(p)
50	1+7i 5+5i 7+i	i·(1+i)·(2−i)^{2} (1+i)·(2+i)·(2−i) −i·(1+i)·(2+i)^{2}
52	4+6i 6+4i	(1+i)^{2}·(3−2i) −i·(1+i)^{2}·(3+2i)
53	2+7i 7+2i	(p) (p)
58	3+7i 7+3i	(1+i)·(5+2i) (1+i)·(5−2i)
61	5+6i 6+5i	(p) (p)
64	8	i·(1+i)^{6}
65	1+8i 4+7i 7+4i 8+i	i·(2+i)·(3−2i) (2+i)·(3+2i) i·(2−i)·(3−2i) (2−i)·(3+2i)
68	2+8i 8+2i	(1+i)^{2}·(4−i) −i·(1+i)^{2}·(4+i)
72	6+6i	−i·(1+i)^{3}·3
73	3+8i 8+3i	(p) (p)
74	5+7i 7+5i	(1+i)·(6+i) (1+i)·(6−i)
80	4+8i 8+4i	−i·(1+i)^{4}·(2−i) −(1+i)^{4}·(2+i)
81	9	3^{2}
82	1+9i 9+i	(1+i)·(5+4i) (1+i)·(5−4i)
85	2+9i 6+7i 7+6i 9+2i	i·(2−i)·(4+i) i·(2−i)·(4−i) (2+i)·(4+i) (2+i)·(4−i)
89	5+8i 8+5i	(p) (p)
90	3+9i 9+3i	(1+i)·(2+i)·3 (1+i)·(2−i)·3
97	4+9i 9+4i	(p) (p)
98	7+7i	(1+i)·7
100	6+8i 8+6i 10	−i·(1+i)^{2}·(2+i)^{2} (1+i)^{2}·(2−i)^{2} −i·(1+i)^{2}·(2+i)·(2−i)
101	1+10i 10+i	(p) (p)
104	2+10i 10+2i	−i·(1+i)^{3}·(3+2i) −i·(1+i)^{3}·(3−2i)
106	5+9i 9+5i	(1+i)·(7+2i) (1+i)·(7−2i)
109	3+10i 10+3i	(p) (p)
113	7+8i 8+7i	(p) (p)
116	4+10i 10+4i	(1+i)^{2}·(5−2i) −i·(1+i)^{2}·(5+2i)
117	6+9i 9+6i	i·3·(3−2i); 3·(3+2i)
121	11	(p)
122	1+11i 11+i	(1+i)·(6+5i) (1+i)·(6−5i)
125	2+11i 5+10i 10+5i 11+2i	(2+i)^{3} i·(2+i)·(2−i)^{2} (2+i)^{2}·(2−i) i·(2−i)^{3}
128	8+8i	i·(1+i)^{7}
130	3+11i 7+9i 9+7i 11+3i	i·(1+i)·(2−i)·(3−2i) (1+i)·(2−i)·(3+2i) (1+i)·(2+i)·(3−2i) −i·(1+i)·(2+i)·(3+2i)
136	6+10i 10+6i	−i·(1+i)^{3}·(4+i) −i·(1+i)^{3}·(4−i)
137	4+11i 11+4i	(p) (p)
144	12	−(1+i)^{4}·3
145	1+12i 8+9i 9+8i 12+i	i·(2−i)·(5+2i) (2+i)·(5+2i) i·(2−i)·(5−2i) (2+i)·(5−2i)
146	5+11i 11+5i	(1+i)·(8+3i) (1+i)·(8−3i)
148	2+12i 12+2i	(1+i)^{2}·(6−i) −i·(1+i)^{2}·(6+i)
149	7+10i 10+7i	(p) (p)
153	3+12i 12+3i	i·3·(4−i); 3·(4+i)
157	6+11i 11+6i	(p) (p)
160	4+12i 12+4i	−(1+i)^{5}·(2+i) −(1+i)^{5}·(2−i)
162	9+9i	(1+i)·3^{2}
164	8+10i 10+8i	(1+i)^{2}·(5−4i) −i·(1+i)^{2}·(5+4i)
169	5+12i 12+5i 13	(3+2i)^{2} i·(3−2i)^{2} (3+2i)·(3−2i)
170	1+13i 7+11i 11+7i 13+i	(1+i)·(2+i)·(4+i) (1+i)·(2+i)·(4−i) (1+i)·(2−i)·(4+i) (1+i)·(2−i)·(4−i)
173	2+13i 13+2i	(p) (p)
178	3+13i 13+3i	(1+i)·(8+5i) (1+i)·(8−5i)
180	6+12i 12+6i	(1+i)^{2}·(2−i)·3 −i·(1+i)^{2}·(2+i)·3
181	9+10i 10+9i	(p) (p)
185	4+13i 8+11i 11+8i 13+4i	i·(2−i)·(6+i) i·(2−i)·(6−i) (2+i)·(6+i) (2+i)·(6−i)
193	7+12i 12+7i	(p) (p)
194	5+13i 13+5i	(1+i)·(9+4i) (1+i)·(9−4i)
196	14	−i·(1+i)^{2}·7
197	1+14i 14+i	(p) (p)
200	2+14i 10+10i 14+2i	(1+i)^{3}·(2−i)^{2} −i·(1+i)^{3}·(2+i)·(2−i) −(1+i)^{3}·(2+i)^{2}
202	9+11i 11+9i	(1+i)·(10+i) (1+i)·(10−i)
205	3+14i 6+13i 13+6i 14+3i	i·(2+i)·(5−4i) (2+i)·(5+4i) i·(2−i)·(5−4i) (2−i)·(5+4i)
208	8+12i 12+8i	−i·(1+i)^{4}·(3−2i) −(1+i)^{4}·(3+2i)
212	4+14i 14+4i	(1+i)^{2}·(7−2i) −i·(1+i)^{2}·(7+2i)
218	7+13i 13+7i	(1+i)·(10+3i) (1+i)·(10−3i)
221	5+14i 10+11i 11+10i 14+5i	i·(3−2i)·(4+i) (3+2i)·(4+i) i·(3−2i)·(4−i) (3+2i)·(4−i)
225	9+12i 12+9i 15	(2+i)^{2}·3 i·(2−i)^{2}·3 (2+i)·(2−i)·3
226	1+15i 15+i	(1+i)·(8+7i) (1+i)·(8−7i)
229	2+15i 15+2i	(p) (p)
232	6+14i 14+6i	−i·(1+i)^{3}·(5+2i) −i·(1+i)^{3}·(5−2i)
233	8+13i 13+8i	(p) (p)
234	3+15i 15+3i	(1+i)·3·(3+2i) (1+i)·3·(3−2i)
241	4+15i 15+4i	(p) (p)
242	11+11i	(1+i)·11
244	10+12i 12+10i	(1+i)^{2}·(6−5i) −i·(1+i)^{2}·(6+5i)
245	7+14i 14+7i	i·(2−i)·7 (2+i)·7
250	5+15i 9+13i 13+9i 15+5i	(1+i)·(2+i)^{2}·(2−i) i·(1+i)·(2−i)^{3} −i·(1+i)·(2+i)^{3} (1+i)·(2+i)·(2−i)^{2}

Norm 251–500
Norm	Integer	Factorization
256	16	(1+i)^{8}
257	1+16i 16+i	(p) (p)
260	2+16i 8+14i 14+8i 16+2i	(1+i)^{2}·(2+i)·(3−2i) −i·(1+i)^{2}·(2+i)·(3+2i) (1+i)^{2}·(2−i)·(3−2i) −i·(1+i)^{2}·(2−i)·(3+2i)
261	6+15i 15+6i	i·3·(5−2i); 3·(5+2i)
265	3+16i 11+12i 12+11i 16+3i	i·(2−i)·(7+2i) i·(2−i)·(7−2i) (2+i)·(7+2i) (2+i)·(7−2i)
269	10+13i 13+10i	(p) (p)
272	4+16i 16+4i	−i·(1+i)^{4}·(4−i) −(1+i)^{4}·(4+i)
274	7+15i 15+7i	(1+i)·(11+4i) (1+i)·(11−4i)
277	9+14i 14+9i	(p) (p)
281	5+16i 16+5i	(p) (p)
288	12+12i	−(1+i)^{5}·3
289	8+15i 15+8i 17	i·(4−i)^{2} (4+i)^{2} (4+i)·(4−i)
290	1+17i 11+13i 13+11i 17+i	i·(1+i)·(2−i)·(5−2i) (1+i)·(2+i)·(5−2i) (1+i)·(2−i)·(5+2i) −i·(1+i)·(2+i)·(5+2i)
292	6+16i 16+6i	(1+i)^{2}·(8−3i) −i·(1+i)^{2}·(8+3i)
293	2+17i 17+2i	(p) (p)
296	10+14i 14+10i	−i·(1+i)^{3}·(6+i) −i·(1+i)^{3}·(6−i)
298	3+17i 17+3i	(1+i)·(10+7i) (1+i)·(10−7i)
305	4+17i 7+16i 16+7i 17+4i	i·(2+i)·(6−5i) (2+i)·(6+5i) i·(2−i)·(6−5i) (2−i)·(6+5i)
306	9+15i 15+9i	(1+i)·3·(4+i) (1+i)·3·(4−i)
313	12+13i 13+12i	(p) (p)
314	5+17i 17+5i	(1+i)·(11+6i) (1+i)·(11−6i)
317	11+14i 14+11i	(p) (p)
320	8+16i 16+8i	−(1+i)^{6}·(2−i) i·(1+i)^{6}·(2+i)
324	18	−i·(1+i)^{2}·3^{2}
325	1+18i 6+17i 10+15i 15+10i 17+6i 18+i	(2+i)^{2}·(3+2i) i·(2−i)^{2}·(3+2i) i·(2+i)·(2−i)·(3−2i) (2+i)·(2−i)·(3+2i) (2+i)^{2}·(3−2i) i·(2−i)^{2}·(3−2i)
328	2+18i 18+2i	−i·(1+i)^{3}·(5+4i) −i·(1+i)^{3}·(5−4i)
333	3+18i 18+3i	i·3·(6−i); 3·(6+i)
337	9+16i 16+9i	(p) (p)
338	7+17i 13+13i 17+7i	i·(1+i)·(3−2i)^{2} (1+i)·(3+2i)·(3−2i) −i·(1+i)·(3+2i)^{2}
340	4+18i 12+14i 14+12i 18+4i	(1+i)^{2}·(2−i)·(4+i) (1+i)^{2}·(2−i)·(4−i) −i·(1+i)^{2}·(2+i)·(4+i) −i·(1+i)^{2}·(2+i)·(4−i)
346	11+15i 15+11i	(1+i)·(13+2i) (1+i)·(13−2i)
349	5+18i 18+5i	(p) (p)
353	8+17i 17+8i	(p) (p)
356	10+16i 16+10i	(1+i)^{2}·(8−5i) −i·(1+i)^{2}·(8+5i)
360	6+18i 18+6i	−i·(1+i)^{3}·(2+i)·3 −i·(1+i)^{3}·(2−i)·3
361	19	(p)
362	1+19i 19+i	(1+i)·(10+9i) (1+i)·(10−9i)
365	2+19i 13+14i 14+13i 19+2i	i·(2−i)·(8+3i) (2+i)·(8+3i) i·(2−i)·(8−3i) (2+i)·(8−3i)
369	12+15i 15+12i	i·3·(5−4i); 3·(5+4i)
370	3+19i 9+17i 17+9i 19+3i	(1+i)·(2+i)·(6+i) (1+i)·(2+i)·(6−i) (1+i)·(2−i)·(6+i) (1+i)·(2−i)·(6−i)
373	7+18i 18+7i	(p) (p)
377	4+19i 11+16i 16+11i 19+4i	i·(3−2i)·(5+2i) (3+2i)·(5+2i) i·(3−2i)·(5−2i) (3+2i)·(5−2i)
386	5+19i 19+5i	(1+i)·(12+7i) (1+i)·(12−7i)
388	8+18i 18+8i	(1+i)^{2}·(9−4i) −i·(1+i)^{2}·(9+4i)
389	10+17i 17+10i	(p) (p)
392	14+14i	−i·(1+i)^{3}·7
394	13+15i 15+13i	(1+i)·(14+i) (1+i)·(14−i)
397	6+19i 19+6i	(p) (p)
400	12+16i 16+12i 20	−(1+i)^{4}·(2+i)^{2} −i·(1+i)^{4}·(2−i)^{2} −(1+i)^{4}·(2+i)·(2−i)
401	1+20i 20+i	(p) (p)
404	2+20i 20+2i	(1+i)^{2}·(10−i) −i·(1+i)^{2}·(10+i)
405	9+18i 18+9i	i·(2−i)·3^{2} (2+i)·3^{2}
409	3+20i 20+3i	(p) (p)
410	7+19i 11+17i 17+11i 19+7i	i·(1+i)·(2−i)·(5−4i) (1+i)·(2−i)·(5+4i) (1+i)·(2+i)·(5−4i) −i·(1+i)·(2+i)·(5+4i)
416	4+20i 20+4i	−(1+i)^{5}·(3+2i) −(1+i)^{5}·(3−2i)
421	14+15i 15+14i	(p) (p)
424	10+18i 18+10i	−i·(1+i)^{3}·(7+2i) −i·(1+i)^{3}·(7−2i)
425	5+20i 8+19i 13+16i 16+13i 19+8i 20+5i	i·(2+i)·(2−i)·(4−i) (2+i)^{2}·(4+i) i·(2−i)^{2}·(4+i) (2+i)^{2}·(4−i) i·(2−i)^{2}·(4−i) (2+i)·(2−i)·(4+i)
433	12+17i 17+12i	(p) (p)
436	6+20i 20+6i	(1+i)^{2}·(10−3i) −i·(1+i)^{2}·(10+3i)
441	21	3·7
442	1+21i 9+19i 19+9i 21+i	i·(1+i)·(3−2i)·(4−i) (1+i)·(3+2i)·(4−i) (1+i)·(3−2i)·(4+i) −i·(1+i)·(3+2i)·(4+i)
445	2+21i 11+18i 18+11i 21+2i	i·(2+i)·(8−5i) (2+i)·(8+5i) i·(2−i)·(8−5i) (2−i)·(8+5i)
449	7+20i 20+7i	(p) (p)
450	3+21i 15+15i 21+3i	i·(1+i)·(2−i)^{2}·3 (1+i)·(2+i)·(2−i)·3 −i·(1+i)·(2+i)^{2}·3
452	14+16i 16+14i	(1+i)^{2}·(8−7i) −i·(1+i)^{2}·(8+7i)
457	4+21i 21+4i	(p) (p)
458	13+17i 17+13i	(1+i)·(15+2i) (1+i)·(15−2i)
461	10+19i 19+10i	(p) (p)
464	8+20i 20+8i	−i·(1+i)^{4}·(5−2i) −(1+i)^{4}·(5+2i)
466	5+21i 21+5i	(1+i)·(13+8i) (1+i)·(13−8i)
468	12+18i 18+12i	(1+i)^{2}·3·(3−2i) −i·(1+i)^{2}·3·(3+2i)
477	6+21i 21+6i	i·3·(7−2i); 3·(7+2i)
481	9+20i 15+16i 16+15i 20+9i	i·(3−2i)·(6+i) i·(3−2i)·(6−i) (3+2i)·(6+i) (3+2i)·(6−i)
482	11+19i 19+11i	(1+i)·(15+4i) (1+i)·(15−4i)
484	22	−i·(1+i)^{2}·11
485	1+22i 14+17i 17+14i 22+i	i·(2−i)·(9+4i) (2+i)·(9+4i) i·(2−i)·(9−4i) (2+i)·(9−4i)
488	2+22i 22+2i	−i·(1+i)^{3}·(6+5i) −i·(1+i)^{3}·(6−5i)
490	7+21i 21+7i	(1+i)·(2+i)·7 (1+i)·(2−i)·7
493	3+22i 13+18i 18+13i 22+3i	i·(4+i)·(5−2i) i·(4−i)·(5−2i) (4+i)·(5+2i) (4−i)·(5+2i)
500	4+22i 10+20i 20+10i 22+4i	−i·(1+i)^{2}·(2+i)^{3} (1+i)^{2}·(2+i)·(2−i)^{2} −i·(1+i)^{2}·(2+i)^{2}·(2−i) (1+i)^{2}·(2−i)^{3}

Norm 501–750
Norm	Integer	Factorization
505	8+21i 12+19i 19+12i 21+8i	i·(2−i)·(10+i) i·(2−i)·(10−i) (2+i)·(10+i) (2+i)·(10−i)
509	5+22i 22+5i	(p) (p)
512	16+16i	(1+i)^{9}
514	15+17i 17+15i	(1+i)·(16+i) (1+i)·(16−i)
520	6+22i 14+18i 18+14i 22+6i	(1+i)^{3}·(2−i)·(3−2i) −i·(1+i)^{3}·(2−i)·(3+2i) −i·(1+i)^{3}·(2+i)·(3−2i) −(1+i)^{3}·(2+i)·(3+2i)
521	11+20i 20+11i	(p) (p)
522	9+21i 21+9i	(1+i)·3·(5+2i) (1+i)·3·(5−2i)
529	23	(p)
530	1+23i 13+19i 19+13i 23+i	(1+i)·(2+i)·(7+2i) (1+i)·(2+i)·(7−2i) (1+i)·(2−i)·(7+2i) (1+i)·(2−i)·(7−2i)
533	2+23i 7+22i 22+7i 23+2i	i·(3+2i)·(5−4i) (3+2i)·(5+4i) i·(3−2i)·(5−4i) (3−2i)·(5+4i)
538	3+23i 23+3i	(1+i)·(13+10i) (1+i)·(13−10i)
541	10+21i 21+10i	(p) (p)
544	12+20i 20+12i	−(1+i)^{5}·(4+i) −(1+i)^{5}·(4−i)
545	4+23i 16+17i 17+16i 23+4i	i·(2−i)·(10+3i) i·(2−i)·(10−3i) (2+i)·(10+3i) (2+i)·(10−3i)
548	8+22i 22+8i	(1+i)^{2}·(11−4i) −i·(1+i)^{2}·(11+4i)
549	15+18i 18+15i	i·3·(6−5i); 3·(6+5i)
554	5+23i 23+5i	(1+i)·(14+9i) (1+i)·(14−9i)
557	14+19i 19+14i	(p) (p)
562	11+21i 21+11i	(1+i)·(16+5i) (1+i)·(16−5i)
565	6+23i 9+22i 22+9i 23+6i	i·(2+i)·(8−7i) (2+i)·(8+7i) i·(2−i)·(8−7i) (2−i)·(8+7i)
569	13+20i 20+13i	(p) (p)
576	24	i·(1+i)^{6}·3
577	1+24i 24+i	(p) (p)
578	7+23i 17+17i 23+7i	(1+i)·(4+i)^{2} (1+i)·(4+i)·(4−i) (1+i)·(4−i)^{2}
580	2+24i 16+18i 18+16i 24+2i	(1+i)^{2}·(2−i)·(5+2i) −i·(1+i)^{2}·(2+i)·(5+2i) (1+i)^{2}·(2−i)·(5−2i) −i·(1+i)^{2}·(2+i)·(5−2i)
584	10+22i 22+10i	−i·(1+i)^{3}·(8+3i) −i·(1+i)^{3}·(8−3i)
585	3+24i 12+21i 21+12i 24+3i	i·(2+i)·3·(3−2i) (2+i)·3·(3+2i) i·(2−i)·3·(3−2i) (2−i)·3·(3+2i)
586	15+19i 19+15i	(1+i)·(17+2i) (1+i)·(17−2i)
592	4+24i 24+4i	−i·(1+i)^{4}·(6−i) −(1+i)^{4}·(6+i)
593	8+23i 23+8i	(p) (p)
596	14+20i 20+14i	(1+i)^{2}·(10−7i) −i·(1+i)^{2}·(10+7i)
601	5+24i 24+5i	(p) (p)
605	11+22i 22+11i	i·(2−i)·11 (2+i)·11
610	9+23i 13+21i 21+13i 23+9i	i·(1+i)·(2−i)·(6−5i) (1+i)·(2−i)·(6+5i) (1+i)·(2+i)·(6−5i) −i·(1+i)·(2+i)·(6+5i)
612	6+24i 24+6i	(1+i)^{2}·3·(4−i) −i·(1+i)^{2}·3·(4+i)
613	17+18i 18+17i	(p) (p)
617	16+19i 19+16i	(p) (p)
625	7+24i 15+20i 20+15i 24+7i 25	−(2−i)^{4} (2+i)^{3}·(2−i) i·(2+i)·(2−i)^{3} −i·(2+i)^{4} (2+i)^{2}·(2−i)^{2}
626	1+25i 25+i	(1+i)·(13+12i) (1+i)·(13−12i)
628	12+22i 22+12i	(1+i)^{2}·(11−6i) −i·(1+i)^{2}·(11+6i)
629	2+25i 10+23i 23+10i 25+2i	i·(4−i)·(6+i) i·(4−i)·(6−i) (4+i)·(6+i) (4+i)·(6−i)
634	3+25i 25+3i	(1+i)·(14+11i) (1+i)·(14−11i)
637	14+21i 21+14i	i·(3−2i)·7 (3+2i)·7
640	8+24i 24+8i	i·(1+i)^{7}·(2+i) i·(1+i)^{7}·(2−i)
641	4+25i 25+4i	(p) (p)
648	18+18i	−i·(1+i)^{3}·3^{2}
650	5+25i 11+23i 17+19i 19+17i 23+11i 25+5i	(1+i)·(2+i)·(2−i)·(3+2i) (1+i)·(2+i)^{2}·(3−2i) i·(1+i)·(2−i)^{2}·(3−2i) −i·(1+i)·(2+i)^{2}·(3+2i) (1+i)·(2−i)^{2}·(3+2i) (1+i)·(2+i)·(2−i)·(3−2i)
653	13+22i 22+13i	(p) (p)
656	16+20i 20+16i	−i·(1+i)^{4}·(5−4i) −(1+i)^{4}·(5+4i)
657	9+24i 24+9i	i·3·(8−3i); 3·(8+3i)
661	6+25i 25+6i	(p) (p)
666	15+21i 21+15i	(1+i)·3·(6+i) (1+i)·3·(6−i)
673	12+23i 23+12i	(p) (p)
674	7+25i 25+7i	(1+i)·(16+9i) (1+i)·(16−9i)
676	10+24i 24+10i 26	−i·(1+i)^{2}·(3+2i)^{2} (1+i)^{2}·(3−2i)^{2} −i·(1+i)^{2}·(3+2i)·(3−2i)
677	1+26i 26+i	(p) (p)
680	2+26i 14+22i 22+14i 26+2i	−i·(1+i)^{3}·(2+i)·(4+i) −i·(1+i)^{3}·(2+i)·(4−i) −i·(1+i)^{3}·(2−i)·(4+i) −i·(1+i)^{3}·(2−i)·(4−i)
685	3+26i 18+19i 19+18i 26+3i	i·(2−i)·(11+4i) (2+i)·(11+4i) i·(2−i)·(11−4i) (2+i)·(11−4i)
689	8+25i 17+20i 20+17i 25+8i	i·(3−2i)·(7+2i) (3+2i)·(7+2i) i·(3−2i)·(7−2i) (3+2i)·(7−2i)
692	4+26i 26+4i	(1+i)^{2}·(13−2i) −i·(1+i)^{2}·(13+2i)
697	11+24i 16+21i 21+16i 24+11i	i·(4+i)·(5−4i) (4+i)·(5+4i) i·(4−i)·(5−4i) (4−i)·(5+4i)
698	13+23i 23+13i	(1+i)·(18+5i) (1+i)·(18−5i)
701	5+26i 26+5i	(p) (p)
706	9+25i 25+9i	(1+i)·(17+8i) (1+i)·(17−8i)
709	15+22i 22+15i	(p) (p)
712	6+26i 26+6i	−i·(1+i)^{3}·(8+5i) −i·(1+i)^{3}·(8−5i)
720	12+24i 24+12i	−i·(1+i)^{4}·(2−i)·3 −(1+i)^{4}·(2+i)·3
722	19+19i	(1+i)·19
724	18+20i 20+18i	(1+i)^{2}·(10−9i) −i·(1+i)^{2}·(10+9i)
725	7+26i 10+25i 14+23i 23+14i 25+10i 26+7i	(2+i)^{2}·(5+2i) i·(2+i)·(2−i)·(5−2i) i·(2−i)^{2}·(5+2i) (2+i)^{2}·(5−2i) (2+i)·(2−i)·(5+2i) i·(2−i)^{2}·(5−2i)
729	27	3^{3}
730	1+27i 17+21i 21+17i 27+i	i·(1+i)·(2−i)·(8−3i) (1+i)·(2+i)·(8−3i) (1+i)·(2−i)·(8+3i) −i·(1+i)·(2+i)·(8+3i)
733	2+27i 27+2i	(p) (p)
738	3+27i 27+3i	(1+i)·3·(5+4i) (1+i)·3·(5−4i)
740	8+26i 16+22i 22+16i 26+8i	(1+i)^{2}·(2−i)·(6+i) (1+i)^{2}·(2−i)·(6−i) −i·(1+i)^{2}·(2+i)·(6+i) −i·(1+i)^{2}·(2+i)·(6−i)
745	4+27i 13+24i 24+13i 27+4i	i·(2+i)·(10−7i) (2+i)·(10+7i) i·(2−i)·(10−7i) (2−i)·(10+7i)
746	11+25i 25+11i	(1+i)·(18+7i) (1+i)·(18−7i)

Norm 751–1000
Norm	Integer	Factorization
754	5+27i 15+23i 23+15i 27+5i	i·(1+i)·(3−2i)·(5−2i) (1+i)·(3+2i)·(5−2i) (1+i)·(3−2i)·(5+2i) −i·(1+i)·(3+2i)·(5+2i)
757	9+26i 26+9i	(p) (p)
761	19+20i 20+19i	(p) (p)
765	6+27i 18+21i 21+18i 27+6i	i·(2−i)·3·(4+i) i·(2−i)·3·(4−i) (2+i)·3·(4+i) (2+i)·3·(4−i)
769	12+25i 25+12i	(p) (p)
772	14+24i 24+14i	(1+i)^{2}·(12−7i) −i·(1+i)^{2}·(12+7i)
773	17+22i 22+17i	(p) (p)
776	10+26i 26+10i	−i·(1+i)^{3}·(9+4i) −i·(1+i)^{3}·(9−4i)
778	7+27i 27+7i	(1+i)·(17+10i) (1+i)·(17−10i)
784	28	−(1+i)^{4}·7
785	1+28i 16+23i 23+16i 28+i	i·(2+i)·(11−6i) (2+i)·(11+6i) i·(2−i)·(11−6i) (2−i)·(11+6i)
788	2+28i 28+2i	(1+i)^{2}·(14−i) −i·(1+i)^{2}·(14+i)
793	3+28i 8+27i 27+8i 28+3i	i·(3+2i)·(6−5i) (3+2i)·(6+5i) i·(3−2i)·(6−5i) (3−2i)·(6+5i)
794	13+25i 25+13i	(1+i)·(19+6i) (1+i)·(19−6i)
797	11+26i 26+11i	(p) (p)
800	4+28i 20+20i 28+4i	−i·(1+i)^{5}·(2−i)^{2} −(1+i)^{5}·(2+i)·(2−i) i·(1+i)^{5}·(2+i)^{2}
801	15+24i 24+15i	i·3·(8−5i); 3·(8+5i)
802	19+21i 21+19i	(1+i)·(20+i) (1+i)·(20−i)
808	18+22i 22+18i	−i·(1+i)^{3}·(10+i) −i·(1+i)^{3}·(10−i)
809	5+28i 28+5i	(p) (p)
810	9+27i 27+9i	(1+i)·(2+i)·3^{2} (1+i)·(2−i)·3^{2}
818	17+23i 23+17i	(1+i)·(20+3i) (1+i)·(20−3i)
820	6+28i 12+26i 26+12i 28+6i	(1+i)^{2}·(2+i)·(5−4i) −i·(1+i)^{2}·(2+i)·(5+4i) (1+i)^{2}·(2−i)·(5−4i) −i·(1+i)^{2}·(2−i)·(5+4i)
821	14+25i 25+14i	(p) (p)
829	10+27i 27+10i	(p) (p)
832	16+24i 24+16i	−(1+i)^{6}·(3−2i) i·(1+i)^{6}·(3+2i)
833	7+28i 28+7i	i·(4−i)·7 (4+i)·7
841	20+21i 21+20i 29	i·(5−2i)^{2} (5+2i)^{2} (5+2i)·(5−2i)
842	1+29i 29+i	(1+i)·(15+14i) (1+i)·(15−14i)
845	2+29i 13+26i 19+22i 22+19i 26+13i 29+2i	−(2−i)·(3−2i)^{2} i·(2−i)·(3+2i)·(3−2i) i·(2+i)·(3−2i)^{2} (2−i)·(3+2i)^{2} (2+i)·(3+2i)·(3−2i) −i·(2+i)·(3+2i)^{2}
848	8+28i 28+8i	−i·(1+i)^{4}·(7−2i) −(1+i)^{4}·(7+2i)
850	3+29i 11+27i 15+25i 25+15i 27+11i 29+3i	(1+i)·(2+i)^{2}·(4−i) i·(1+i)·(2−i)^{2}·(4−i) (1+i)·(2+i)·(2−i)·(4+i) (1+i)·(2+i)·(2−i)·(4−i) −i·(1+i)·(2+i)^{2}·(4+i) (1+i)·(2−i)^{2}·(4+i)
853	18+23i 23+18i	(p) (p)
857	4+29i 29+4i	(p) (p)
865	9+28i 17+24i 24+17i 28+9i	i·(2−i)·(13+2i) i·(2−i)·(13−2i) (2+i)·(13+2i) (2+i)·(13−2i)
866	5+29i 29+5i	(1+i)·(17+12i) (1+i)·(17−12i)
872	14+26i 26+14i	−i·(1+i)^{3}·(10+3i) −i·(1+i)^{3}·(10−3i)
873	12+27i 27+12i	i·3·(9−4i); 3·(9+4i)
877	6+29i 29+6i	(p) (p)
881	16+25i 25+16i	(p) (p)
882	21+21i	(1+i)·3·7
884	10+28i 20+22i 22+20i 28+10i	(1+i)^{2}·(3−2i)·(4+i) −i·(1+i)^{2}·(3+2i)·(4+i) (1+i)^{2}·(3−2i)·(4−i) −i·(1+i)^{2}·(3+2i)·(4−i)
890	7+29i 19+23i 23+19i 29+7i	i·(1+i)·(2−i)·(8−5i) (1+i)·(2−i)·(8+5i) (1+i)·(2+i)·(8−5i) −i·(1+i)·(2+i)·(8+5i)
898	13+27i 27+13i	(1+i)·(20+7i) (1+i)·(20−7i)
900	18+24i 24+18i 30	−i·(1+i)^{2}·(2+i)^{2}·3 (1+i)^{2}·(2−i)^{2}·3 −i·(1+i)^{2}·(2+i)·(2−i)·3
901	1+30i 15+26i 26+15i 30+i	i·(4+i)·(7−2i) i·(4−i)·(7−2i) (4+i)·(7+2i) (4−i)·(7+2i)
904	2+30i 30+2i	−i·(1+i)^{3}·(8+7i) −i·(1+i)^{3}·(8−7i)
905	8+29i 11+28i 28+11i 29+8i	i·(2+i)·(10−9i) (2+i)·(10+9i) i·(2−i)·(10−9i) (2−i)·(10+9i)
909	3+30i 30+3i	i·3·(10−i); 3·(10+i)
914	17+25i 25+17i	(1+i)·(21+4i) (1+i)·(21−4i)
916	4+30i 30+4i	(1+i)^{2}·(15−2i) −i·(1+i)^{2}·(15+2i)
922	9+29i 29+9i	(1+i)·(19+10i) (1+i)·(19−10i)
925	5+30i 14+27i 21+22i 22+21i 27+14i 30+5i	i·(2+i)·(2−i)·(6−i) (2+i)^{2}·(6+i) i·(2−i)^{2}·(6+i) (2+i)^{2}·(6−i) i·(2−i)^{2}·(6−i) (2+i)·(2−i)·(6+i)
928	12+28i 28+12i	−(1+i)^{5}·(5+2i) −(1+i)^{5}·(5−2i)
929	20+23i 23+20i	(p) (p)
932	16+26i 26+16i	(1+i)^{2}·(13−8i) −i·(1+i)^{2}·(13+8i)
936	6+30i 30+6i	−i·(1+i)^{3}·3·(3+2i) −i·(1+i)^{3}·3·(3−2i)
937	19+24i 24+19i	(p) (p)
941	10+29i 29+10i	(p) (p)
949	7+30i 18+25i 25+18i 30+7i	i·(3−2i)·(8+3i) (3+2i)·(8+3i) i·(3−2i)·(8−3i) (3+2i)·(8−3i)
953	13+28i 28+13i	(p) (p)
954	15+27i 27+15i	(1+i)·3·(7+2i) (1+i)·3·(7−2i)
961	31	(p)
962	1+31i 11+29i 29+11i 31+i	(1+i)·(3+2i)·(6+i) (1+i)·(3+2i)·(6−i) (1+i)·(3−2i)·(6+i) (1+i)·(3−2i)·(6−i)
964	8+30i 30+8i	(1+i)^{2}·(15−4i) −i·(1+i)^{2}·(15+4i)
965	2+31i 17+26i 26+17i 31+2i	i·(2+i)·(12−7i) (2+i)·(12+7i) i·(2−i)·(12−7i) (2−i)·(12+7i)
968	22+22i	−i·(1+i)^{3}·11
970	3+31i 21+23i 23+21i 31+3i	i·(1+i)·(2−i)·(9−4i) (1+i)·(2+i)·(9−4i) (1+i)·(2−i)·(9+4i) −i·(1+i)·(2+i)·(9+4i)
976	20+24i 24+20i	−i·(1+i)^{4}·(6−5i) −(1+i)^{4}·(6+5i)
977	4+31i 31+4i	(p) (p)
980	14+28i 28+14i	(1+i)^{2}·(2−i)·7 −i·(1+i)^{2}·(2+i)·7
981	9+30i 30+9i	i·3·(10−3i); 3·(10+3i)
985	12+29i 16+27i 27+16i 29+12i	i·(2−i)·(14+i) i·(2−i)·(14−i) (2+i)·(14+i) (2+i)·(14−i)
986	5+31i 19+25i 25+19i 31+5i	(1+i)·(4+i)·(5+2i) (1+i)·(4−i)·(5+2i) (1+i)·(4+i)·(5−2i) (1+i)·(4−i)·(5−2i)
997	6+31i 31+6i	(p) (p)
1000	10+30i 18+26i 26+18i 30+10i	−i·(1+i)^{3}·(2+i)^{2}·(2−i) (1+i)^{3}·(2−i)^{3} −(1+i)^{3}·(2+i)^{3} −i·(1+i)^{3}·(2+i)·(2−i)^{2}

== See also ==
- Gaussian integer
- Table of divisors
- Integer factorization
