= Landau–Ramanujan constant =

Constant value used in mathematics

In mathematics and the field of number theory, the Landau–Ramanujan constant is the positive real number b that occurs in a theorem proved by Edmund Landau in 1908, stating that for large $x$, the number of positive integers below $x$ that are the sum of two square numbers behaves asymptotically as

$$\dfrac{bx}{\sqrt{\log(x)}}.$$

This constant b was rediscovered in 1913 by Srinivasa Ramanujan, in the first letter he wrote to G.H. Hardy.

== Sums of two squares ==
By the sum of two squares theorem, the numbers that can be expressed as a sum of two squares of integers are the ones for which each prime number congruent to 3 mod 4 appears with an even exponent in their prime factorization. For instance, 45 = 9 + 36 is a sum of two squares; in its prime factorization, 3^{2} × 5, the prime 3 appears with an even exponent, and the prime 5 is congruent to 1 mod 4, so its exponent can be odd.

Landau's theorem states that if $N(x)$ is the number of positive integers less than $x$ that are the sum of two squares, then

$\lim_{x\rightarrow\infty}\ \left(\dfrac{N(x)}{\dfrac{x}{\sqrt{\log(x)}}}\right)=b\approx 0.764223653589220662990698731250092328116790541$ (sequence A064533 in the OEIS),

where $b$ is the Landau–Ramanujan constant.

The Landau-Ramanujan constant can also be written as an infinite product:

$b = \frac{1}{\sqrt{2}}\prod_{p\equiv 3 \pmod{4}} \left(1 - \frac{1}{p^2}\right)^{-1/2} = \frac{\pi}{4} \prod_{p\equiv 1 \pmod{4}} \left(1 - \frac{1}{p^2}\right)^{1/2}.$

== History ==
This constant was stated by Landau in the limit form above; Ramanujan instead approximated $N(x)$ as an integral, with the same constant of proportionality, and with a slowly growing error term.
