= Sum of squares function =

Number-theoretical function

In number theory, the sum of squares function is an arithmetic function that gives the number of representations for a given positive integer $n$ as the sum of $k$ squares, where representations that differ only in the order of the summands or in the signs of the numbers being squared are counted as different. It is denoted by $r_k(n)$.

== Definition ==
The function is defined as

$$r_k(n) = |\{(a_1, a_2, \ldots, a_k) \in \mathbb{Z}^k \ : \ n = a_1^2 + a_2^2 + \cdots + a_k^2\}|$$

where $|\,\ |$ denotes the cardinality of a set. In other words, $r_k(n)$ is the number of ways $n$ can be written as a sum of $k$ squares.

For example, $r_2(1) = 4$ since $1 = 0^2 + (\pm 1)^2 = (\pm 1)^2 + 0^2$ where each sum has two sign combinations, and also $r_2(2) = 4$ since $2 = (\pm 1)^2 + (\pm 1)^2$ with four sign combinations. On the other hand, $r_2(3) = 0$ because there is no way to represent 3 as a sum of two squares.

== Formulae ==
=== k = 2 ===
Integers satisfying the sum of two squares theorem are squares of possible distances between integer lattice points; values up to 100 are shown, with: • / Squares (and thus integer distances) in red; • / Non-unique representations (up to rotation and reflection) bolded

The number of ways to write a natural number as sum of two squares is given by $r_2(n)$. It is given explicitly by

$$r_2(n) = 4(d_1(n)-d_3(n))$$

where $d_1(n)$ is the number of divisors of $n$ which are congruent to 1 modulo 4 and $d_3(n)$ is the number of divisors of $n$ which are congruent to 3 modulo 4. Using sums, the expression can be written as:

$$r_2(n) = 4\sum_{d \mid n \atop d\,\equiv\,1,3 \pmod 4}(-1)^{(d-1)/2}$$

The prime factorization $n = 2^g p_1^{f_1}p_2^{f_2}\cdots q_1^{h_1}q_2^{h_2}\cdots$, where $p_i$ are the prime factors of the form $p_i \equiv 1\pmod 4,$ and $q_i$ are the prime factors of the form $q_i \equiv 3\pmod 4$ gives another formula

$r_2(n) = 4 (f_1 +1)(f_2+1)\cdots$, if all exponents $h_1, h_2, \cdots$ are even. If one or more $h_i$ are odd, then $r_2(n) = 0$.

=== k = 3 ===
Gauss proved that for a squarefree number $n>4$,

$$r_3(n) = \begin{cases}
24 h(-n), & \text{if } n\equiv 3\pmod{8}, \\
0 & \text{if } n\equiv 7\pmod{8}, \\
12 h(-4n) & \text{otherwise},
\end{cases}$$

where $h(m)$ denotes the class number of an integer $m$.

There exist extensions of Gauss' formula to arbitrary integer $n$.

=== k = 4 ===
The number of ways to represent $n$ as the sum of four squares was due to Carl Gustav Jakob Jacobi and it is eight times the sum of all its divisors which are not divisible by 4, i.e.

$$r_4(n)=8\sum_{d\,\mid\,n,\ 4\,\nmid\,d}d.$$

Representing $n=2^k m$, where $m$ is an odd integer, one can express $r_4(n)$ in terms of the divisor function as follows:

$$r_4(n) = 8\sigma(2^{\min\{k,1\}}m).$$

=== k = 6 ===
The number of ways to represent $n$ as the sum of six squares is given by

$$r_6(n) = 4\sum_{d\mid n} d^2\big( 4\left(\tfrac{-4}{n/d}\right) - \left(\tfrac{-4}{d}\right)\big),$$

where $\left(\tfrac{\cdot}{\cdot}\right)$ is the Kronecker symbol.

=== k = 8 ===
Jacobi also found an explicit formula for the case $k=8$:

$$r_8(n) = 16\sum_{d\,\mid\,n}(-1)^{n+d}d^3.$$

== Generating function ==
The generating function of the sequence $r_k(n)$ for fixed k can be expressed in terms of the Jacobi theta function:

$$\vartheta(0;q)^k = \vartheta_3^k(q) = \sum_{n=0}^{\infty}r_k(n)q^n,$$

where

$$\vartheta(0;q) = \sum_{n=-\infty}^{\infty}q^{n^2} = 1 + 2q + 2q^4 + 2q^9 + 2q^{16} + \cdots.$$

== Numerical values ==
The first 30 values for $r_k(n), \; k=1, \dots, 8$ are listed in the table below:

n	=	$r_1(n)$	$r_2(n)$	$r_3(n)$	$r_4(n)$	$r_5(n)$	$r_6(n)$	$r_7(n)$	$r_8(n)$
0	0	1	1	1	1	1	1	1	1
1	1	2	4	6	8	10	12	14	16
2	2	0	4	12	24	40	60	84	112
3	3	0	0	8	32	80	160	280	448
4	2^{2}	2	4	6	24	90	252	574	1136
5	5	0	8	24	48	112	312	840	2016
6	2×3	0	0	24	96	240	544	1288	3136
7	7	0	0	0	64	320	960	2368	5504
8	2^{3}	0	4	12	24	200	1020	3444	9328
9	3^{2}	2	4	30	104	250	876	3542	12112
10	2×5	0	8	24	144	560	1560	4424	14112
11	11	0	0	24	96	560	2400	7560	21312
12	2^{2}×3	0	0	8	96	400	2080	9240	31808
13	13	0	8	24	112	560	2040	8456	35168
14	2×7	0	0	48	192	800	3264	11088	38528
15	3×5	0	0	0	192	960	4160	16576	56448
16	2^{4}	2	4	6	24	730	4092	18494	74864
17	17	0	8	48	144	480	3480	17808	78624
18	2×3^{2}	0	4	36	312	1240	4380	19740	84784
19	19	0	0	24	160	1520	7200	27720	109760
20	2^{2}×5	0	8	24	144	752	6552	34440	143136
21	3×7	0	0	48	256	1120	4608	29456	154112
22	2×11	0	0	24	288	1840	8160	31304	149184
23	23	0	0	0	192	1600	10560	49728	194688
24	2^{3}×3	0	0	24	96	1200	8224	52808	261184
25	5^{2}	2	12	30	248	1210	7812	43414	252016
26	2×13	0	8	72	336	2000	10200	52248	246176
27	3^{3}	0	0	32	320	2240	13120	68320	327040
28	2^{2}×7	0	0	0	192	1600	12480	74048	390784
29	29	0	8	72	240	1680	10104	68376	390240
30	2×3×5	0	0	48	576	2720	14144	71120	395136

== See also ==
- Integer partition
- Jacobi's four-square theorem
- Gauss circle problem
