= Dirichlet convolution =

Mathematical operation on arithmetical functions

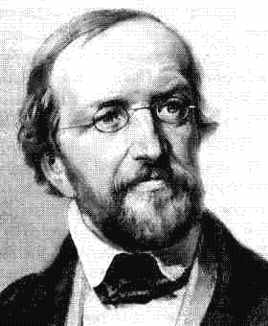
Johann Peter Gustav Lejeune Dirichlet

In mathematics, Dirichlet convolution (or divisor convolution) is a binary operation defined for arithmetic functions; it is important in number theory. It was developed by Peter Gustav Lejeune Dirichlet.

== Definition ==
If $f , g : \mathbb{N}\to\mathbb{C}$ are two arithmetic functions, their Dirichlet convolution $f*g$ is a new arithmetic function defined by:

$$(f*g)(n) \ =\ \sum_{d\,\mid \,n} f(d)\,g\!\left(\frac{n}{d}\right) \ =\  \sum_{ab\,=\,n}\!f(a)\,g(b),$$

where the sum extends over all positive divisors $d$ of $n$, or equivalently over all distinct pairs $(a,b)$ of positive integers whose product is $n$.

This product occurs naturally in the study of Dirichlet series such as the Riemann zeta function. It describes the multiplication of two Dirichlet series in terms of their coefficients:

$$\left(\sum_{n\geq 1}\frac{f(n)}{n^s}\right)
\left(\sum_{n\geq 1}\frac{g(n)}{n^s}\right)
\ = \
\left(\sum_{n\geq 1}\frac{(f*g)(n)}{n^s}\right).$$

== Properties ==
The set of arithmetic functions forms a commutative ring, the Dirichlet ring, with addition given by pointwise addition and multiplication by Dirichlet convolution. The multiplicative identity is the unit function $\varepsilon$ defined by $\varepsilon(n)=1$ if $n=1$ and $0$ otherwise. The units (invertible elements) of this ring are the arithmetic functions $f$ with $f(1) \neq 0$. Since the non-units are closed under addition, this ring is local.

Specifically, Dirichlet convolution is associative,

$$(f * g) * h = f * (g * h),$$

distributive over addition

$$f * (g + h) = f * g + f * h$$,

commutative,

$$f * g = g * f$$,

and has an identity element,

$f * \varepsilon$ = $\varepsilon * f = f$.

Furthermore, for each function $f$ having $f(1) \neq 0$, there exists another arithmetic function $f^{-1}$ satisfying $f * f^{-1} = \varepsilon$, called the Dirichlet inverse of $f$.

The Dirichlet convolution of two multiplicative functions is again multiplicative, and every not constantly zero multiplicative function has a Dirichlet inverse which is also multiplicative. In other words, multiplicative functions form a subgroup of the group of invertible elements of the Dirichlet ring. Beware however that the sum of two multiplicative functions is not multiplicative (since $(f+g)(1)=f(1)+g(1)=2 \neq 1$), so the subset of multiplicative functions is not a subring of the Dirichlet ring. The article on multiplicative functions lists several convolution relations among important multiplicative functions.

Another operation on arithmetic functions is pointwise multiplication: $fg$ is defined by $(fg)(n)=f(n)g(n)$. Given a completely multiplicative function $h$, pointwise multiplication by $h$ distributes over Dirichlet convolution: $(f * g)h = (fh) * (gh)$. The convolution of two completely multiplicative functions is multiplicative, but not necessarily completely multiplicative.

== Properties and examples ==
In these formulas, we use the following arithmetical functions:

- $\varepsilon$ is the multiplicative identity: $\varepsilon(1) = 1$, otherwise 0 ($\varepsilon(n)=\lfloor \tfrac1n \rfloor$).
- $1$ is the constant function with value 1: $1(n) = 1$ for all $n$. Keep in mind that $1$ is not the identity. (Some authors denote this as $\zeta$ because the associated Dirichlet series is the Riemann zeta function.)
- $1_C$ for $C \subset \mathbb{N}$ is a set indicator function: $1_C(n) = 1$ iff $n \in C$, otherwise 0.
- $\text{Id}$ is the identity function with value n: $\text{Id}(n) = n$.
- $\text{Id}_k$ is the kth power function: $\text{Id}_k(n)=n^k$.

The following relations hold:

- $1 * \mu = \varepsilon$, the Dirichlet inverse of the constant function $1$ is the Möbius function (see proof). Hence:
- $g = f * 1$ if and only if $f = g * \mu$, the Möbius inversion formula.
- $\sigma_k = \text{Id}_k * 1$, the kth-power-of-divisors sum function σ_{k}.
- $\sigma = \text{Id} * 1$, the sum-of-divisors function σ = σ_{1}.
- $\tau = 1 * 1$ , the number-of-divisors function τ(n) = σ_{0}.
- $\text{Id}_k = \sigma_k * \mu$, by Möbius inversion of the formulas for σ_{k}, σ, and τ.
- $\text{Id} = \sigma * \mu$
- $1 = \tau * \mu$
- $\phi * 1 = \text{Id}$ , proved under Euler's totient function.
- $\phi = \text{Id} * \mu$ , by Möbius inversion.
- $\sigma = \phi * \tau$ , from convolving 1 on both sides of $\phi * 1 = \text{Id}$.
- $\lambda * |\mu| = \varepsilon$ where λ is Liouville's function.
- $\text{Id} * \phi = P$, where $P$ is Pillai's arithmetical function, also known as the gcd-sum function.
- $\lambda * 1 = 1_{\text{Sq}}$ where Sq = {1, 4, 9, ...} is the set of squares.
- $\text{Id}_k * (\text{Id}_k \mu) = \varepsilon$
- $\tau^3 * 1 = (\tau * 1)^2$
- $J_k * 1 = \text{Id}_k$, Jordan's totient function.
- $(\text{Id}_s J_r) * J_s = J_{s + r}$
- $\Lambda * 1 = \log$, where $\Lambda$ is von Mangoldt's function.
- $|\mu| \ast 1 = 2^{\omega},$ where $\omega(n)$ is the prime omega function counting distinct prime factors of n.
- $\Omega \ast \mu = 1_{\mathcal{P}}$, the characteristic function of the prime powers.
- $\omega \ast \mu = 1_{\mathbb{P}}$ where $1_{\mathbb{P}}(n) \mapsto \{0,1\}$ is the characteristic function of the primes.

This last identity shows that the prime-counting function is given by the summatory function

$$\pi(x) = \sum_{n \leq x} (\omega \ast \mu)(n) = \sum_{d=1}^{x} \omega(d) M\left(\left\lfloor \frac{x}{d} \right\rfloor\right)$$

where $M(x)$ is the Mertens function and $\omega$ is the distinct prime factor counting function from above. This expansion follows from the identity for the sums over Dirichlet convolutions given on the divisor sum identities page (a standard trick for these sums).

== Dirichlet inverse ==
=== Examples ===
Given an arithmetic function $f$ its Dirichlet inverse $g = f^{-1}$ may be calculated recursively: the value of $g(n)$ is in terms of $g(m)$ for $m<n$.

For $n=1$:

$(f * g) (1) = f(1) g(1) = \varepsilon(1) = 1$, so
$g(1) = 1/f(1)$. This implies that $f$ does not have a Dirichlet inverse if $f(1) = 0$.

For $n=2$:

$$(f * g) (2) = f(1) g(2) + f(2) g(1) = \varepsilon(2) = 0$$,
$$g(2) = -(f(2) g(1))/f(1)$$,

For $n=3$:

$$(f * g) (3) = f(1) g(3) + f(3) g(1) = \varepsilon(3) = 0$$,
$$g(3) = -(f(3) g(1))/f(1)$$,

For $n=4$:

$$(f * g) (4) = f(1) g(4) + f(2) g(2) + f(4) g(1) = \varepsilon(4) = 0$$,
$$g(4) = -(f(4) g(1) + f(2) g(2))/f(1)$$,

and in general for $n>1$,

$$g(n) \ =\
\frac {-1}{f(1)} \mathop{\sum_{d\,\mid \,n}}_{d < n}
f\left(\frac{n}{d}\right) g(d).$$

=== Properties ===
The following properties of the Dirichlet inverse hold:

- The function f has a Dirichlet inverse if and only if f(1) ≠ 0.
- The Dirichlet inverse of a multiplicative function is again multiplicative.
- The Dirichlet inverse of a Dirichlet convolution is the convolution of the inverses of each function: $(f \ast g)^{-1} = f^{-1} \ast g^{-1}$.
- A multiplicative function f is completely multiplicative if and only if $f^{-1}(n) = \mu(n) f(n)$.
- If f is completely multiplicative then $(f \cdot g)^{-1} = f \cdot g^{-1}$ whenever $g(1) \neq 0$ and where $\cdot$ denotes pointwise multiplication of functions.

=== Other formulas ===
Arithmetic function	Dirichlet inverse:
Constant function with value 1	Möbius function μ
$n^{\alpha}$	$\mu(n) \,n^\alpha$
Liouville's function λ	Absolute value of Möbius function |μ|
Euler's totient function $\varphi$	$\sum_{d|n} d\, \mu(d)$
The generalized sum-of-divisors function $\sigma_{\alpha}$	$\sum_{d|n} d^{\alpha} \mu(d) \mu\left(\frac{n}{d}\right)$

An exact, non-recursive formula for the Dirichlet inverse of any arithmetic function f is given in Divisor sum identities. A more partition theoretic expression for the Dirichlet inverse of f is given by

$$f^{-1}(n) = \sum_{k=1}^{\Omega(n)} \left\{
\sum_{{\lambda_1+2\lambda_2+\cdots+k\lambda_k=n} \atop {\lambda_1, \lambda_2, \ldots, \lambda_k | n}}
\frac{(\lambda_1+\lambda_2+\cdots+\lambda_k)!}{1! 2! \cdots k!}
(-1)^k f(\lambda_1) f(\lambda_2)^2 \cdots f(\lambda_k)^k\right\}.$$

The following formula provides a compact way of expressing the Dirichlet inverse of an invertible arithmetic function f :

$f^{-1}=\sum_{k=0}^{+\infty}\frac{(f(1)\varepsilon-f)^{*k}}{f(1)^{k+1}}$

where the expression $(f(1)\varepsilon-f)^{*k}$ stands for the arithmetic function $f(1)\varepsilon-f$ convoluted with itself k times. Notice that, for a fixed positive integer $n$, if $k>\Omega(n)$ then $(f(1)\varepsilon-f)^{*k}(n)=0$ , this is because $f(1)\varepsilon(1) - f(1) = 0$ and every way of expressing n as a product of k positive integers must include a 1, so the series on the right hand side converges for every fixed positive integer n.

== Dirichlet series ==
If f is an arithmetic function, the Dirichlet series generating function is defined by

$$DG(f;s) = \sum_{n=1}^\infty \frac{f(n)}{n^s}$$

for those complex arguments s for which the series converges (if there are any). The multiplication of Dirichlet series is compatible with Dirichlet convolution in the following sense:

$$DG(f;s) DG(g;s) = DG(f*g;s)\,$$

for all s for which both series of the left hand side converge, one of them at least converging absolutely (note that simple convergence of both series of the left hand side does not imply convergence of the right hand side!). This is akin to the convolution theorem if one thinks of Dirichlet series as a Fourier transform.

== Related concepts ==
The restriction of the divisors in the convolution to unitary, bi-unitary or infinitary divisors defines similar commutative operations which share many features with the Dirichlet convolution (existence of a Möbius inversion, persistence of multiplicativity, definitions of totients, Euler-type product formulas over associated primes, etc.).

Dirichlet convolution is a special case of the convolution multiplication for the incidence algebra of a poset, in this case the poset of positive integers ordered by divisibility.

The Dirichlet hyperbola method computes the summation of a convolution in terms of its functions and their summation functions.

== See also ==
- Arithmetic function
- Divisor sum identities
- Möbius inversion formula
