= Unit function =

Function in number theory

In number theory, the unit function is a completely multiplicative function on the positive integers defined as:

$$\varepsilon(n) = \begin{cases} 1, & \mbox{if }n=1 \\ 0, & \mbox{if }n \neq 1 \end{cases}$$

It is called the unit function because it is the identity element for Dirichlet convolution.

It may be described as the "indicator function of 1" within the set of positive integers. It is also written as $u(n)$ (not to be confused with $\mu(n)$, which generally denotes the Möbius function).

== See also ==
- Heaviside step function
- Kronecker delta
- Möbius inversion formula
