= Arithmetic function =

Function whose domain is the positive integers

In number theory, an arithmetic, arithmetical, or number-theoretic function is generally any function whose domain is the set of positive integers and whose range is a subset of the complex numbers. Hardy & Wright include in their definition the requirement that an arithmetical function "expresses some arithmetical property of n". There is a larger class of number-theoretic functions that do not fit this definition, for example, the prime-counting functions. This article provides links to functions of both classes.

An example of an arithmetic function is the divisor function whose value at a positive integer n is equal to the number of divisors of n.

Arithmetic functions are often extremely irregular (see table), but some of them have series expansions in terms of Ramanujan's sum.

== Multiplicative and additive functions ==
An arithmetic function a is

- completely additive if a(mn) = a(m) + a(n) for all natural numbers m and n;
- completely multiplicative if a(1) = 1 and a(mn) = a(m)a(n) for all natural numbers m and n;

Two whole numbers m and n are called coprime if their greatest common divisor is 1, that is, if there is no prime number that divides both of them.

Then an arithmetic function a is

- additive if a(mn) = a(m) + a(n) for all coprime natural numbers m and n;
- multiplicative if a(1) = 1 and a(mn) = a(m)a(n) for all coprime natural numbers m and n.

== Notation ==
In this article, $\sum_p f(p)$ and $\prod_p f(p)$ mean that the sum or product is over all prime numbers:
$$\sum_p f(p) = f(2) + f(3) + f(5) + \cdots$$
and
$$\prod_p f(p)= f(2)f(3)f(5)\cdots.$$
Similarly, $\sum_{p^k} f(p^k)$ and $\prod_{p^k} f(p^k)$ mean that the sum or product is over all prime powers with strictly positive exponent (so k = 0 is not included):
$$\sum_{p^k} f(p^k) = \sum_p\sum_{k > 0} f(p^k) = f(2) + f(3) + f(4) +f(5) +f(7)+f(8)+f(9)+\cdots.$$

The notations $\sum_{d\mid n} f(d)$ and $\prod_{d\mid n} f(d)$ mean that the sum or product is over all positive divisors of n, including 1 and n. For example, if n = 12, then
$$\prod_{d\mid 12} f(d) = f(1)f(2) f(3)  f(4)  f(6)  f(12).$$

The notations can be combined: $\sum_{p\mid n} f(p)$ and $\prod_{p\mid n} f(p)$ mean that the sum or product is over all prime divisors of n. For example, if n = 18, then
$$\sum_{p\mid 18} f(p) = f(2) + f(3),$$
and similarly $\sum_{p^k\mid n} f(p^k)$ and $\prod_{p^k\mid n} f(p^k)$ mean that the sum or product is over all prime powers dividing n. For example, if n = 24, then
$$\prod_{p^k\mid 24} f(p^k) = f(2) f(3) f(4) f(8).$$

== Ω(n), ω(n), ν_{p}(n) – prime power decomposition ==
The fundamental theorem of arithmetic states that any positive integer n can be represented uniquely as a product of powers of primes: $n = p_1^{a_1}\cdots p_k^{a_k}$ where p_{1} < p_{2} < ... < p_{k} are primes and the a_{j} are positive integers. (1 is given by the empty product.)

It is often convenient to write this as an infinite product over all the primes, where all but a finite number have a zero exponent. Define the p-adic valuation ν_{p}(n) to be the exponent of the highest power of the prime p that divides n. That is, if p is one of the p_{i} then ν_{p}(n) = a_{i}, otherwise it is zero. Then
$$n = \prod_p p^{\nu_p(n)}.$$

In terms of the above the prime omega functions ω and Ω are defined by

ω(n) = k,
Ω(n) = a_{1} + a_{2} + ... + a_{k}.

To avoid repetition, formulas for the functions listed in this article are, whenever possible, given in terms of n and the corresponding p_{i}, a_{i}, ω, and Ω.

== Multiplicative functions ==
=== σ_{k}(n), τ(n), d(n) – divisor sums ===
σ_{k}(n) is the sum of the kth powers of the positive divisors of n, including 1 and n, where k is a complex number.

σ_{1}(n), the sum of the (positive) divisors of n, is usually denoted by σ(n).

Since a positive number to the zero power is one, σ_{0}(n) is therefore the number of (positive) divisors of n; it is usually denoted by d(n) or τ(n) (for the German Teiler = divisors).

$$\sigma_k(n) = \prod_{i=1}^{\omega(n)} \frac{p_i^{(a_i+1)k}-1}{p_i^k-1}= \prod_{i=1}^{\omega(n)} \left(1 + p_i^k + p_i^{2k} + \cdots + p_i^{a_i k}\right).$$

Setting k = 0 in the second product gives
$$\tau(n) = d(n) = (1 + a_{1})(1+a_{2})\cdots(1+a_{\omega(n)}).$$

=== φ(n) – Euler totient function ===
φ(n), the Euler totient function, is the number of positive integers not greater than n that are coprime to n.
$$\varphi(n) = n \prod_{p\mid n} \left(1-\frac{1}{p}\right)
= n \left(\frac{p_1 - 1}{p_1}\right)\left(\frac{p_2 - 1}{p_2}\right) \cdots \left(\frac{p_{\omega(n)} - 1}{p_{\omega(n)}}\right)
.$$

=== J_{k}(n) – Jordan totient function ===
J_{k}(n), the Jordan totient function, is the number of k-tuples of positive integers all less than or equal to n that form a coprime (k + 1)-tuple together with n. It is a generalization of Euler's totient, φ(n) = J_{1}(n).
$$J_k(n) = n^k \prod_{p\mid n} \left(1-\frac{1}{p^k}\right)
= n^k \left(\frac{p^k_1 - 1}{p^k_1}\right)\left(\frac{p^k_2 - 1}{p^k_2}\right) \cdots \left(\frac{p^k_{\omega(n)} - 1}{p^k_{\omega(n)}}\right)
.$$

=== μ(n) – Möbius function ===
μ(n), the Möbius function, is important because of the Möbius inversion formula. See § Dirichlet convolution, below.
$$\mu(n)=\begin{cases}
(-1)^{\omega(n)}=(-1)^{\Omega(n)} &\text{if }\; \omega(n) = \Omega(n)\\
0&\text{if }\;\omega(n) \ne \Omega(n).
\end{cases}$$

This implies that μ(1) = 1. (Because Ω(1) = ω(1) = 0.)

=== τ(n) – Ramanujan tau function ===
τ(n), the Ramanujan tau function, is defined by its generating function identity:
$$\sum_{n\geq 1}\tau(n)q^n=q\prod_{n\geq 1}(1-q^n)^{24}.$$

Although it is hard to say exactly what "arithmetical property of n" it "expresses", (τ(n) is (2π)^{−12} times the nth Fourier coefficient in the q-expansion of the modular discriminant function) it is included among the arithmetical functions because it is multiplicative and it occurs in identities involving certain σ_{k}(n) and r_{k}(n) functions (because these are also coefficients in the expansion of modular forms).

=== c_{q}(n) – Ramanujan's sum ===
c_{q}(n), Ramanujan's sum, is the sum of the nth powers of the primitive qth roots of unity:
$$c_q(n) = \sum_{\stackrel{1\le a\le q}{ \gcd(a,q)=1}} e^{2 \pi i \tfrac{a}{q} n}.$$

Even though it is defined as a sum of complex numbers (irrational for most values of q), it is an integer. For a fixed value of n it is multiplicative in q:

If q and r are coprime, then $c_q(n)c_r(n)=c_{qr}(n).$

=== ψ(n) – Dedekind psi function ===
The Dedekind psi function, used in the theory of modular functions, is defined by the formula
$$\psi(n) = n \prod_{p|n}\left(1+\frac{1}{p}\right).$$

== Completely multiplicative functions ==
=== λ(n) – Liouville function ===
λ(n), the Liouville function, is defined by
$$\lambda (n) = (-1)^{\Omega(n)}.$$

=== χ(n) – characters ===
All Dirichlet characters χ(n) are completely multiplicative. Two characters have special notations:

The principal character (mod n) is denoted by χ_{0}(a) (or χ_{1}(a)). It is defined as
$$\chi_0(a) = \begin{cases}
1 & \text{if } \gcd(a,n) = 1, \\
0 & \text{if } \gcd(a,n) \ne 1.
\end{cases}$$

The quadratic character (mod n) is denoted by the Jacobi symbol for odd n (it is not defined for even n):
$$\left(\frac{a}{n}\right) = \left(\frac{a}{p_1}\right)^{a_1}\left(\frac{a}{p_2}\right)^{a_2}\cdots \left(\frac{a}{p_{\omega(n)}}\right)^{a_{\omega(n)}}.$$

In this formula $(\tfrac{a}{p})$ is the Legendre symbol, defined for all integers a and all odd primes p by
$$\left(\frac{a}{p}\right) = \begin{cases}
\;\;\,0 & \text{if } a \equiv 0 \pmod p,
\\+1 & \text{if }a \not\equiv 0\pmod p \text{ and for some integer }x, \;a\equiv x^2\pmod p
\\-1 & \text{if there is no such } x. \end{cases}$$

Following the normal convention for the empty product, $\left(\frac{a}{1}\right) = 1.$

== Additive functions ==
=== ω(n) – distinct prime divisors ===
ω(n), defined above as the number of distinct primes dividing n, is additive (see Prime omega function).

== Completely additive functions ==
=== Ω(n) – prime divisors ===
Ω(n), defined above as the number of prime factors of n counted with multiplicities, is completely additive (see Prime omega function).

=== ν_{p}(n) – p-adic valuation of an integer n ===
For a fixed prime p, ν_{p}(n), defined above as the exponent of the largest power of p dividing n, is completely additive.

=== Logarithmic derivative ===
$\operatorname{ld}(n)=\frac{D(n)}{n} = \sum_{\stackrel{p\mid n}{p\text{ prime}}} \frac {v_p(n)} {p}$, where $D(n)$ is the arithmetic derivative.

== Neither multiplicative nor additive ==
=== π(x), Π(x), ϑ(x), ψ(x) – prime-counting functions ===
These important functions (which are not arithmetic functions) are defined for non-negative real arguments, and are used in the various statements and proofs of the prime number theorem. They are summation functions (see the main section just below) of arithmetic functions which are neither multiplicative nor additive.

π(x), the prime-counting function, is the number of primes not exceeding x. It is the summation function of the characteristic function of the prime numbers.
$$\pi(x) = \sum_{p \le x} 1$$

A related function counts prime powers with weight 1 for primes, 1/2 for their squares, 1/3 for cubes, etc. It is the summation function of the arithmetic function which takes the value 1/k on integers which are the kth power of some prime number, and the value 0 on other integers.
$$\Pi(x) = \sum_{p^k\le x}\frac{1}{k}.$$

ϑ(x) and ψ(x), the Chebyshev functions, are defined as sums of the natural logarithms of the primes not exceeding x.
$$\vartheta(x)=\sum_{p\le x} \log p,$$
$$\psi(x) = \sum_{p^k\le x} \log p.$$

The second Chebyshev function ψ(x) is the summation function of the von Mangoldt function just below.

=== Λ(n) – von Mangoldt function ===
Λ(n), the von Mangoldt function, is 0 unless the argument n is a prime power p^{k}, in which case it is the natural logarithm of the prime p:
$$\Lambda(n) = \begin{cases}
\log p &\text{if } n = 2,3,4,5,7,8,9,11,13,16,\ldots=p^k \text{ is a prime power}\\
0&\text{if } n=1,6,10,12,14,15,18,20,21,\dots \;\;\;\;\text{ is not a prime power}.
\end{cases}$$

=== p(n) – partition function ===
p(n), the partition function, is the number of ways of representing n as a sum of positive integers, where two representations with the same summands in a different order are not counted as being different:
$$p(n) = \left|\left\{ (a_1, a_2,\dots a_k): 0 < a_1 \le a_2 \le \cdots \le a_k\; \land \;n=a_1+a_2+\cdots +a_k \right\}\right|.$$

=== λ(n) – Carmichael function ===
λ(n), the Carmichael function, is the smallest positive number such that $a^{\lambda(n)}\equiv 1 \pmod{n}$ for all a coprime to n. Equivalently, it is the least common multiple of the orders of the elements of the multiplicative group of integers modulo n.

For powers of odd primes and for 2 and 4, λ(n) is equal to the Euler totient function of n; for powers of 2 greater than 4 it is equal to one half of the Euler totient function of n:
$$\lambda(n) = \begin{cases}
\;\;\phi(n) &\text{if }n = 2,3,4,5,7,9,11,13,17,19,23,25,27,\dots\\
\tfrac 1 2 \phi(n)&\text{if }n=8,16,32,64,\dots
\end{cases}$$
and for general n it is the least common multiple of λ of each of the prime power factors of n:
$$\lambda(p_1^{a_1}p_2^{a_2} \dots p_{\omega(n)}^{a_{\omega(n)}}) = \operatorname{lcm}[\lambda(p_1^{a_1}),\;\lambda(p_2^{a_2}),\dots,\lambda(p_{\omega(n)}^{a_{\omega(n)}}) ].$$

=== h(n) – class number ===
h(n), the class number function, is the order of the ideal class group of an algebraic extension of the rationals with discriminant n. The notation is ambiguous, as there are in general many extensions with the same discriminant. See quadratic field and cyclotomic field for classical examples.

=== r_{k}(n) – sum of k squares ===
r_{k}(n) is the number of ways n can be represented as the sum of k squares, where representations that differ only in the order of the summands or in the signs of the square roots are counted as different.
$$r_k(n) = \left|\left\{(a_1, a_2,\dots,a_k):n=a_1^2+a_2^2+\cdots+a_k^2\right\}\right|$$

=== D(n) – Arithmetic derivative ===
Using the Heaviside notation for the derivative, the arithmetic derivative D(n) is a function such that

- $D(n) = 1$ if n prime, and
- $D(mn) = m D(n) + D(m) n$ (the product rule)

== Summation functions ==
Given an arithmetic function a(n), its summation function A(x) is defined by
$$A(x) := \sum_{n \le x} a(n) .$$
A can be regarded as a function of a real variable. Given a positive integer m, A is constant along open intervals m < x < m + 1, and has a jump discontinuity at each integer for which a(m) ≠ 0.

Since such functions are often represented by series and integrals, to achieve pointwise convergence it is usual to define the value at the discontinuities as the average of the values to the left and right:
$$A_0(m) := \frac 1 2 \left(\sum_{n < m} a(n) +\sum_{n \le m} a(n)\right) = A(m) - \frac 1 2 a(m) .$$

Individual values of arithmetic functions may fluctuate wildly – as in most of the above examples. Summation functions "smooth out" these fluctuations. In some cases it may be possible to find asymptotic behaviour for the summation function for large x.

A classical example of this phenomenon is given by the divisor summatory function, the summation function of d(n), the number of divisors of n:
$$\liminf_{n\to\infty} d(n) = 2$$
$$\limsup_{n\to\infty}\frac{\log d(n) \log\log n}{\log n} = \log 2$$
$$\lim_{n\to\infty}\frac{d(1) + d(2)+ \cdots +d(n)}{\log(1) + \log(2)+ \cdots +\log(n)} = 1.$$

An average order of an arithmetic function is some simpler or better-understood function which has the same summation function asymptotically, and hence takes the same values "on average". We say that g is an average order of f if
$$\sum_{n \le x} f(n) \sim \sum_{n \le x} g(n)$$

as x tends to infinity. The example above shows that d(n) has the average order log(n).

== Dirichlet convolution ==
Given an arithmetic function a(n), let F_{a}(s), for complex s, be the function defined by the corresponding Dirichlet series (where it converges):
$$F_a(s) := \sum_{n=1}^\infty \frac{a(n)}{n^s} .$$
F_{a}(s) is called a generating function of a(n). The simplest such series, corresponding to the constant function a(n) = 1 for all n, is ζ(s) the Riemann zeta function.

The generating function of the Möbius function is the inverse of the zeta function:
$$\zeta(s)\,\sum_{n=1}^\infty\frac{\mu(n)}{n^s}=1, \;\;\Re s >1.$$

Consider two arithmetic functions a and b and their respective generating functions F_{a}(s) and F_{b}(s). The product F_{a}(s)F_{b}(s) can be computed as follows:
$$F_a(s)F_b(s) = \left( \sum_{m=1}^{\infty}\frac{a(m)}{m^s} \right)\left( \sum_{n=1}^{\infty}\frac{b(n)}{n^s} \right) .$$

It is a straightforward exercise to show that if c(n) is defined by
$$c(n) := \sum_{ij = n} a(i)b(j) = \sum_{i\mid n}a(i)b\left(\frac{n}{i}\right) ,$$
then
$$F_c(s) = F_a(s) F_b(s).$$

This function c is called the Dirichlet convolution of a and b, and is denoted by $a*b$.

A particularly important case is convolution with the constant function a(n) = 1 for all n, corresponding to multiplying the generating function by the zeta function:
$$g(n) = \sum_{d \mid n}f(d).$$

Multiplying by the inverse of the zeta function gives the Möbius inversion formula:
$$f(n) = \sum_{d\mid n}\mu\left(\frac{n}{d}\right)g(d).$$

If f is multiplicative, then so is g. If f is completely multiplicative, then g is multiplicative, but may or may not be completely multiplicative.

== Relations among the functions ==
There are a great many formulas connecting arithmetical functions with each other and with the functions of analysis, especially powers, roots, and the exponential and log functions. The page divisor sum identities contains many more generalized and related examples of identities involving arithmetic functions.

Here are a few examples:

=== Dirichlet convolutions ===
$$\sum_{\delta\mid n}\mu(\delta)=
\sum_{\delta\mid n}\lambda\left(\frac{n}{\delta}\right)|\mu(\delta)|=
\begin{cases}
1 & \text{if } n=1\\
0 & \text{if } n\ne1
\end{cases}$$
where λ is the Liouville function.
$\sum_{\delta\mid n}\varphi(\delta) = n.$

$\varphi(n) =\sum_{\delta\mid n}\mu\left(\frac{n}{\delta}\right)\delta =n\sum_{\delta\mid n}\frac{\mu(\delta)}{\delta}.$ Möbius inversion

$\sum_{\delta \mid n } J_k(\delta) = n^k.$

$J_k(n) =\sum_{\delta\mid n}\mu\left(\frac{n}{\delta}\right)\delta^k =n^k\sum_{\delta\mid n}\frac{\mu(\delta)}{\delta^k}.$ Möbius inversion

$\sum_{\delta\mid n}\delta^sJ_r(\delta)J_s\left(\frac{n}{\delta}\right) = J_{r+s}(n)$
$\sum_{\delta\mid n}\varphi(\delta)d\left(\frac{n}{\delta}\right) = \sigma(n).$
$\sum_{\delta\mid n}|\mu(\delta)| = 2^{\omega(n)}.$

$|\mu(n)|=\sum_{\delta\mid n}\mu\left(\frac{n}{\delta}\right)2^{\omega(\delta)}.$ Möbius inversion

$\sum_{\delta\mid n}2^{\omega(\delta)}=d(n^2).$

$2^{\omega(n)}=\sum_{\delta\mid n}\mu\left(\frac{n}{\delta}\right)d(\delta^2).$ Möbius inversion

$\sum_{\delta\mid n}d(\delta^2)=d^2(n).$

$d(n^2)=\sum_{\delta\mid n}\mu\left(\frac{n}{\delta}\right)d^2(\delta).$ Möbius inversion

$\sum_{\delta\mid n}d\left(\frac{n}{\delta}\right)2^{\omega(\delta)}=d^2(n).$
$$\sum_{\delta\mid n}\lambda(\delta)=\begin{cases}
&1\text{ if } n \text{ is a square }\\
&0\text{ if } n \text{ is not  square.}
\end{cases}$$
where λ is the Liouville function.
$\sum_{\delta\mid n}\Lambda(\delta) = \log n.$

$\Lambda(n)=\sum_{\delta\mid n}\mu\left(\frac{n}{\delta}\right)\log(\delta).$ Möbius inversion

=== Sums of squares ===
For all $k \ge 4,\;\;\; r_k(n) > 0.$ (Lagrange's four-square theorem).

$r_2(n) = 4\sum_{d\mid n}\left(\frac{-4}{d}\right),$

where the Kronecker symbol has the values

$$\left(\frac{-4}{n}\right) =
\begin{cases}
+1&\text{if }n\equiv 1 \pmod 4 \\
-1&\text{if }n\equiv 3 \pmod 4\\
\;\;\;0&\text{if }n\text{ is even}.\\
\end{cases}$$

There is a formula for r_{3} in the section on class numbers below.
$$r_4(n) =
8 \sum_{\stackrel{d\mid n}{ 4\, \nmid \,d}}d =
8 (2+(-1)^n)\sum_{\stackrel{d\mid n}{ 2\, \nmid \,d}}d =
\begin{cases}
8\sigma(n)&\text{if } n \text{ is odd }\\
24\sigma\left(\frac{n}{2^\nu}\right)&\text{if } n \text{ is even }
\end{cases},$$
where ν = ν_{2}(n).
$$r_6(n) = 16 \sum_{d\mid n} \chi\left(\frac{n}{d}\right)d^2 - 4\sum_{d\mid n} \chi(d)d^2,$$
where $\chi(n) = \left(\frac{-4}{n}\right).$

Define the function σ_{k}^{*}(n) as
$$\sigma_k^*(n) = (-1)^{n}\sum_{d\mid n}(-1)^d d^k=
\begin{cases}
\sum_{d\mid n} d^k=\sigma_k(n)&\text{if } n \text{ is odd }\\
\sum_{\stackrel{d\mid n}{ 2\, \mid \,d}}d^k -\sum_{\stackrel{d\mid n}{ 2\, \nmid \,d}}d^k&\text{if } n \text{ is even}.
\end{cases}$$

That is, if n is odd, σ_{k}^{*}(n) is the sum of the kth powers of the divisors of n, that is, σ_{k}(n), and if n is even it is the sum of the kth powers of the even divisors of n minus the sum of the kth powers of the odd divisors of n.

$r_8(n) = 16\sigma_3^*(n).$

Adopt the convention that Ramanujan's τ(x) = 0 if x is not an integer.

$r_{24}(n) = \frac{16}{691}\sigma_{11}^*(n) + \frac{128}{691}\left\{ (-1)^{n-1}259\tau(n)-512\tau\left(\frac{n}{2}\right)\right\}$

=== Divisor sum convolutions ===
Here "convolution" does not mean "Dirichlet convolution" but instead refers to the formula for the coefficients of the product of two power series:

$$\left(\sum_{n=0}^\infty a_n x^n\right)\left(\sum_{n=0}^\infty b_n x^n\right)
= \sum_{i=0}^\infty \sum_{j=0}^\infty  a_i b_j x^{i+j}
= \sum_{n=0}^\infty \left(\sum_{i=0}^n a_i b_{n-i}\right) x^n
= \sum_{n=0}^\infty c_n x^n
.$$

The sequence $c_n = \sum_{i=0}^n a_i b_{n-i}$ is called the convolution or the Cauchy product of the sequences a_{n} and b_{n}.
These formulas may be proved analytically (see Eisenstein series) or by elementary methods.

$\sigma_3(n) = \frac{1}{5}\left\{6n\sigma_1(n)-\sigma_1(n) + 12\sum_{0<k<n}\sigma_1(k)\sigma_1(n-k)\right\}.$
$\sigma_5(n) = \frac{1}{21}\left\{10(3n-1)\sigma_3(n)+\sigma_1(n) + 240\sum_{0<k<n}\sigma_1(k)\sigma_3(n-k)\right\}.$
$$\begin{align}
\sigma_7(n)
&=\frac{1}{20}\left\{21(2n-1)\sigma_5(n)-\sigma_1(n) + 504\sum_{0<k<n}\sigma_1(k)\sigma_5(n-k)\right\}\\
&=\sigma_3(n) + 120\sum_{0<k<n}\sigma_3(k)\sigma_3(n-k).
\end{align}$$
$$\begin{align}
\sigma_9(n)
&= \frac{1}{11}\left\{10(3n-2)\sigma_7(n)+\sigma_1(n) + 480\sum_{0<k<n}\sigma_1(k)\sigma_7(n-k)\right\}\\
&= \frac{1}{11}\left\{21\sigma_5(n)-10\sigma_3(n) + 5040\sum_{0<k<n}\sigma_3(k)\sigma_5(n-k)\right\}.
\end{align}$$
$\tau(n) = \frac{65}{756}\sigma_{11}(n) + \frac{691}{756}\sigma_{5}(n) - \frac{691}{3}\sum_{0<k<n}\sigma_5(k)\sigma_5(n-k),$ where τ(n) is Ramanujan's function.

Since σ_{k}(n) (for natural number k) and τ(n) are integers, the above formulas can be used to prove congruences for the functions. See Ramanujan tau function for some examples.

Extend the domain of the partition function by setting p(0) = 1.

$p(n)=\frac{1}{n}\sum_{1\le k\le n}\sigma(k)p(n-k).$ This recurrence can be used to compute p(n).

=== Class number related ===
Peter Gustav Lejeune Dirichlet discovered formulas that relate the class number h of quadratic number fields to the Jacobi symbol.

An integer D is called a fundamental discriminant if it is the discriminant of a quadratic number field. This is equivalent to D ≠ 1 and either a) D is squarefree and D ≡ 1 (mod 4) or b) D ≡ 0 (mod 4), D/4 is squarefree, and D/4 ≡ 2 or 3 (mod 4).

Extend the Jacobi symbol to accept even numbers in the "denominator" by defining the Kronecker symbol:
$$\left(\frac{a}{2}\right) = \begin{cases}
\;\;\,0&\text{ if } a \text{ is even}
\\(-1)^{\frac{a^2-1}{8}}&\text{ if }a \text{ is odd. }
\end{cases}$$

Then if D < −4 is a fundamental discriminant
$$\begin{align}
h(D) & = \frac{1}{D} \sum_{r=1}^{|D|}r\left(\frac{D}{r}\right)\\
& = \frac{1}{2-\left(\tfrac{D}{2}\right)} \sum_{r=1}^{|D|/2}\left(\frac{D}{r}\right).
\end{align}$$

There is also a formula relating r_{3} and h. Again, let D be a fundamental discriminant, D < −4. Then
$$r_3(|D|) = 12\left(1-\left(\frac{D}{2}\right)\right)h(D).$$

=== Prime-count related ===
Let $H_n = 1 + \frac 1 2 + \frac 1 3 + \cdots +\frac{1}{n}$ be the nth harmonic number. Then

$\sigma(n) \le H_n + e^{H_n}\log H_n$ is true for every natural number n if and only if the Riemann hypothesis is true.

The Riemann hypothesis is also equivalent to the statement that, for all n > 5040,
$$\sigma(n) < e^\gamma n \log \log n$$
(where γ is the Euler–Mascheroni constant). This is Robin's theorem.

$$\sum_{p}\nu_p(n) = \Omega(n).$$
$\psi(x)=\sum_{n\le x}\Lambda(n).$
$\Pi(x)= \sum_{n\le x}\frac{\Lambda(n)}{\log n}.$
$e^{\theta(x)}=\prod_{p\le x}p.$
$e^{\psi(x)}= \operatorname{lcm}[1,2,\dots,\lfloor x\rfloor].$

=== Menon's identity ===
In 1965 P Kesava Menon proved
$$\sum_{\stackrel{1\le k\le n}{ \gcd(k,n)=1}} \gcd(k-1,n)=\varphi(n)d(n).$$

This has been generalized by a number of mathematicians. For example,

- B. Sury
  $$\sum_{\stackrel{1\le k_1, k_2, \dots, k_s\le n}{ \gcd(k_1,n)=1}} \gcd(k_1-1,k_2,\dots,k_s,n)
= \varphi(n)\sigma_{s-1}(n).$$
- N. Rao
  $$\sum_{\stackrel{1\le k_1, k_2, \dots, k_s\le n}{ \gcd(k_1,k_2,\dots,k_s,n)=1}} \gcd(k_1-a_1,k_2-a_2,\dots,k_s-a_s,n)^s
=J_s(n)d(n),$$
  where a_{1}, a_{2}, ..., a_{s} are integers, gcd(a_{1}, a_{2}, ..., a_{s}, n) = 1.
- László Fejes Tóth
  $$\sum_{\stackrel{1\le k\le m}{ \gcd(k,m)=1}} \gcd(k^2-1,m_1)\gcd(k^2-1,m_2)
=\varphi(n)\sum_{\stackrel{d_1\mid m_1} {d_2\mid m_2}} \varphi(\gcd(d_1, d_2))2^{\omega(\operatorname{lcm}(d_1, d_2))},$$
  where m_{1} and m_{2} are odd, m = lcm(m_{1}, m_{2}).

In fact, if f is any arithmetical function
$$\sum_{\stackrel{1\le k\le n}{ \gcd(k,n)=1}} f(\gcd(k-1,n))
=\varphi(n)\sum_{d\mid n}\frac{(\mu*f)(d)}{\varphi(d)},$$
where $*$ stands for Dirichlet convolution.

=== Miscellaneous ===
Let m and n be distinct, odd, and positive. Then the Jacobi symbol satisfies the law of quadratic reciprocity:
$$\left(\frac{m}{n}\right) \left(\frac{n}{m}\right) = (-1)^{(m-1)(n-1)/4}.$$

Let D(n) be the arithmetic derivative. Then the logarithmic derivative
$$\frac{D(n)}{n} = \sum_{\stackrel{p\mid n}{p\text{ prime}}} \frac {v_{p}(n)} {p}.$$
See Arithmetic derivative for details.

Let λ(n) be Liouville's function. Then

$|\lambda(n)|\mu(n) =\lambda(n)|\mu(n)| = \mu(n),$ and
$\lambda(n)\mu(n) = |\mu(n)| =\mu^2(n).$

Let λ(n) be Carmichael's function. Then

$\lambda(n)\mid \phi(n).$ Further,
$$\lambda(n)= \phi(n) \text{ if and only if }n=\begin{cases}
1,2, 4;\\
3,5,7,9,11, \ldots \text{ (that is, } p^k \text{, where }p\text{ is an odd prime)};\\
6,10,14,18,\ldots \text{ (that is, } 2p^k\text{, where }p\text{ is an odd prime)}.
\end{cases}$$

See Multiplicative group of integers modulo n and Primitive root modulo n.

$2^{\omega(n)} \le d(n) \le 2^{\Omega(n)}.$
$\frac{6}{\pi^2}<\frac{\phi(n)\sigma(n)}{n^2} < 1.$
$$\begin{align}
c_q(n)
&=\frac{\mu\left(\frac{q}{\gcd(q, n)}\right)}{\phi\left(\frac{q}{\gcd(q, n)}\right)}\phi(q)\\
&=\sum_{\delta\mid \gcd(q,n)}\mu\left(\frac{q}{\delta}\right)\delta.
\end{align}$$
Note that $\phi(q) = \sum_{\delta\mid q}\mu\left(\frac{q}{\delta}\right)\delta.$
$$c_q(1) = \mu(q).$$
$$c_q(q) = \phi(q).$$
$\sum_{\delta\mid n}d^{3}(\delta) = \left(\sum_{\delta\mid n}d(\delta)\right)^2.$ Compare this with 1^{3} + 2^{3} + 3^{3} + ... + n^{3} = (1 + 2 + 3 + ... + n)^{2}
$d(uv) = \sum_{\delta\mid \gcd(u,v)}\mu(\delta)d\left(\frac{u}{\delta}\right)d\left(\frac{v}{\delta}\right).$
$\sigma_k(u)\sigma_k(v) = \sum_{\delta\mid \gcd(u,v)}\delta^k\sigma_k\left(\frac{uv}{\delta^2}\right).$
$\tau(u)\tau(v) = \sum_{\delta\mid \gcd(u,v)}\delta^{11}\tau\left(\frac{uv}{\delta^2}\right),$ where τ(n) is Ramanujan's function.

== First 100 values of some arithmetic functions ==
n	factorization	φ(n)	ω(n)	Ω(n)	λ(n)	μ(n)	Λ(n)	π(n)	σ_{0}(n)	σ_{1}(n)	σ_{2}(n)	r_{2}(n)	r_{3}(n)	r_{4}(n)
1	1	1	0	0	1	1	0	0	1	1	1	4	6	8
2	2	1	1	1	−1	−1	0.69	1	2	3	5	4	12	24
3	3	2	1	1	−1	−1	1.10	2	2	4	10	0	8	32
4	2^{2}	2	1	2	1	0	0.69	2	3	7	21	4	6	24
5	5	4	1	1	−1	−1	1.61	3	2	6	26	8	24	48
6	2 · 3	2	2	2	1	1	0	3	4	12	50	0	24	96
7	7	6	1	1	−1	−1	1.95	4	2	8	50	0	0	64
8	2^{3}	4	1	3	−1	0	0.69	4	4	15	85	4	12	24
9	3^{2}	6	1	2	1	0	1.10	4	3	13	91	4	30	104
10	2 · 5	4	2	2	1	1	0	4	4	18	130	8	24	144
11	11	10	1	1	−1	−1	2.40	5	2	12	122	0	24	96
12	2^{2} · 3	4	2	3	−1	0	0	5	6	28	210	0	8	96
13	13	12	1	1	−1	−1	2.56	6	2	14	170	8	24	112
14	2 · 7	6	2	2	1	1	0	6	4	24	250	0	48	192
15	3 · 5	8	2	2	1	1	0	6	4	24	260	0	0	192
16	2^{4}	8	1	4	1	0	0.69	6	5	31	341	4	6	24
17	17	16	1	1	−1	−1	2.83	7	2	18	290	8	48	144
18	2 · 3^{2}	6	2	3	−1	0	0	7	6	39	455	4	36	312
19	19	18	1	1	−1	−1	2.94	8	2	20	362	0	24	160
20	2^{2} · 5	8	2	3	−1	0	0	8	6	42	546	8	24	144
21	3 · 7	12	2	2	1	1	0	8	4	32	500	0	48	256
22	2 · 11	10	2	2	1	1	0	8	4	36	610	0	24	288
23	23	22	1	1	−1	−1	3.14	9	2	24	530	0	0	192
24	2^{3} · 3	8	2	4	1	0	0	9	8	60	850	0	24	96
25	5^{2}	20	1	2	1	0	1.61	9	3	31	651	12	30	248
26	2 · 13	12	2	2	1	1	0	9	4	42	850	8	72	336
27	3^{3}	18	1	3	−1	0	1.10	9	4	40	820	0	32	320
28	2^{2} · 7	12	2	3	−1	0	0	9	6	56	1050	0	0	192
29	29	28	1	1	−1	−1	3.37	10	2	30	842	8	72	240
30	2 · 3 · 5	8	3	3	−1	−1	0	10	8	72	1300	0	48	576
31	31	30	1	1	−1	−1	3.43	11	2	32	962	0	0	256
32	2^{5}	16	1	5	−1	0	0.69	11	6	63	1365	4	12	24
33	3 · 11	20	2	2	1	1	0	11	4	48	1220	0	48	384
34	2 · 17	16	2	2	1	1	0	11	4	54	1450	8	48	432
35	5 · 7	24	2	2	1	1	0	11	4	48	1300	0	48	384
36	2^{2} · 3^{2}	12	2	4	1	0	0	11	9	91	1911	4	30	312
37	37	36	1	1	−1	−1	3.61	12	2	38	1370	8	24	304
38	2 · 19	18	2	2	1	1	0	12	4	60	1810	0	72	480
39	3 · 13	24	2	2	1	1	0	12	4	56	1700	0	0	448
40	2^{3} · 5	16	2	4	1	0	0	12	8	90	2210	8	24	144
41	41	40	1	1	−1	−1	3.71	13	2	42	1682	8	96	336
42	2 · 3 · 7	12	3	3	−1	−1	0	13	8	96	2500	0	48	768
43	43	42	1	1	−1	−1	3.76	14	2	44	1850	0	24	352
44	2^{2} · 11	20	2	3	−1	0	0	14	6	84	2562	0	24	288
45	3^{2} · 5	24	2	3	−1	0	0	14	6	78	2366	8	72	624
46	2 · 23	22	2	2	1	1	0	14	4	72	2650	0	48	576
47	47	46	1	1	−1	−1	3.85	15	2	48	2210	0	0	384
48	2^{4} · 3	16	2	5	−1	0	0	15	10	124	3410	0	8	96
49	7^{2}	42	1	2	1	0	1.95	15	3	57	2451	4	54	456
50	2 · 5^{2}	20	2	3	−1	0	0	15	6	93	3255	12	84	744
51	3 · 17	32	2	2	1	1	0	15	4	72	2900	0	48	576
52	2^{2} · 13	24	2	3	−1	0	0	15	6	98	3570	8	24	336
53	53	52	1	1	−1	−1	3.97	16	2	54	2810	8	72	432
54	2 · 3^{3}	18	2	4	1	0	0	16	8	120	4100	0	96	960
55	5 · 11	40	2	2	1	1	0	16	4	72	3172	0	0	576
56	2^{3} · 7	24	2	4	1	0	0	16	8	120	4250	0	48	192
57	3 · 19	36	2	2	1	1	0	16	4	80	3620	0	48	640
58	2 · 29	28	2	2	1	1	0	16	4	90	4210	8	24	720
59	59	58	1	1	−1	−1	4.08	17	2	60	3482	0	72	480
60	2^{2} · 3 · 5	16	3	4	1	0	0	17	12	168	5460	0	0	576
61	61	60	1	1	−1	−1	4.11	18	2	62	3722	8	72	496
62	2 · 31	30	2	2	1	1	0	18	4	96	4810	0	96	768
63	3^{2} · 7	36	2	3	−1	0	0	18	6	104	4550	0	0	832
64	2^{6}	32	1	6	1	0	0.69	18	7	127	5461	4	6	24
65	5 · 13	48	2	2	1	1	0	18	4	84	4420	16	96	672
66	2 · 3 · 11	20	3	3	−1	−1	0	18	8	144	6100	0	96	1152
67	67	66	1	1	−1	−1	4.20	19	2	68	4490	0	24	544
68	2^{2} · 17	32	2	3	−1	0	0	19	6	126	6090	8	48	432
69	3 · 23	44	2	2	1	1	0	19	4	96	5300	0	96	768
70	2 · 5 · 7	24	3	3	−1	−1	0	19	8	144	6500	0	48	1152
71	71	70	1	1	−1	−1	4.26	20	2	72	5042	0	0	576
72	2^{3} · 3^{2}	24	2	5	−1	0	0	20	12	195	7735	4	36	312
73	73	72	1	1	−1	−1	4.29	21	2	74	5330	8	48	592
74	2 · 37	36	2	2	1	1	0	21	4	114	6850	8	120	912
75	3 · 5^{2}	40	2	3	−1	0	0	21	6	124	6510	0	56	992
76	2^{2} · 19	36	2	3	−1	0	0	21	6	140	7602	0	24	480
77	7 · 11	60	2	2	1	1	0	21	4	96	6100	0	96	768
78	2 · 3 · 13	24	3	3	−1	−1	0	21	8	168	8500	0	48	1344
79	79	78	1	1	−1	−1	4.37	22	2	80	6242	0	0	640
80	2^{4} · 5	32	2	5	−1	0	0	22	10	186	8866	8	24	144
81	3^{4}	54	1	4	1	0	1.10	22	5	121	7381	4	102	968
82	2 · 41	40	2	2	1	1	0	22	4	126	8410	8	48	1008
83	83	82	1	1	−1	−1	4.42	23	2	84	6890	0	72	672
84	2^{2} · 3 · 7	24	3	4	1	0	0	23	12	224	10500	0	48	768
85	5 · 17	64	2	2	1	1	0	23	4	108	7540	16	48	864
86	2 · 43	42	2	2	1	1	0	23	4	132	9250	0	120	1056
87	3 · 29	56	2	2	1	1	0	23	4	120	8420	0	0	960
88	2^{3} · 11	40	2	4	1	0	0	23	8	180	10370	0	24	288
89	89	88	1	1	−1	−1	4.49	24	2	90	7922	8	144	720
90	2 · 3^{2} · 5	24	3	4	1	0	0	24	12	234	11830	8	120	1872
91	7 · 13	72	2	2	1	1	0	24	4	112	8500	0	48	896
92	2^{2} · 23	44	2	3	−1	0	0	24	6	168	11130	0	0	576
93	3 · 31	60	2	2	1	1	0	24	4	128	9620	0	48	1024
94	2 · 47	46	2	2	1	1	0	24	4	144	11050	0	96	1152
95	5 · 19	72	2	2	1	1	0	24	4	120	9412	0	0	960
96	2^{5} · 3	32	2	6	1	0	0	24	12	252	13650	0	24	96
97	97	96	1	1	−1	−1	4.57	25	2	98	9410	8	48	784
98	2 · 7^{2}	42	2	3	−1	0	0	25	6	171	12255	4	108	1368
99	3^{2} · 11	60	2	3	−1	0	0	25	6	156	11102	0	72	1248
100	2^{2} · 5^{2}	40	2	4	1	0	0	25	9	217	13671	12	30	744
n	factorization	φ(n)	ω(n)	Ω(n)	𝜆(n)	𝜇(n)	Λ(n)	π(n)	σ_{0}(n)	σ_{1}(n)	σ_{2}(n)	r_{2}(n)	r_{3}(n)	r_{4}(n)
