= Multiplicative function =

Function equal to the product of its values on coprime factors

In number theory, a multiplicative function is an arithmetic function $f$ of a positive integer $n$ with the property that $f(1)=1$ and
$$f(ab) = f(a)f(b)$$
whenever $a$ and $b$ are coprime.

An arithmetic function is said to be completely multiplicative (or totally multiplicative) if $f(1)=1$ and $f(ab) = f(a)f(b)$ holds for all positive integers $a$ and $b$, even when they are not coprime.

== Examples ==
Some multiplicative functions are defined to make formulas easier to write:

- $1(n)$: the constant function defined by $1(n)=1$
- $\operatorname{Id}(n)$: the identity function, defined by $\operatorname{Id}(n)=n$
- $\operatorname{Id}_k(n)$: the power functions, defined by $\operatorname{Id}_k(n)=n^k$ for any complex number $k$. As special cases we have
  - $\operatorname{Id}_0(n)=1(n)$, and
  - $\operatorname{Id}_1(n)=\operatorname{Id}(n)$.
- $\varepsilon(n)$: the function defined by $\varepsilon(n)=1$ if $n=1$ and $0$ otherwise; this is the unit function, so called because it is the multiplicative identity for Dirichlet convolution. Sometimes written as $u(n)$; not to be confused with $\mu(n)$.
- $\lambda(n)$: the Liouville function, $\lambda(n)=(-1)^{\Omega(n)}$, where $\Omega(n)$ is the total number of primes (counted with multiplicity) dividing $n$

The above functions are all completely multiplicative.

- $1_C(n)$: the indicator function of the set $C\subseteq \Z$. This function is multiplicative precisely when $C$ is closed under multiplication of coprime elements. There are also other sets (not closed under multiplication) that give rise to such functions, such as the set of square-free numbers.

Other examples of multiplicative functions include many functions of importance in number theory, such as:

- $\gcd(n,k)$: the greatest common divisor of $n$ and $k$, as a function of $n$, where $k$ is a fixed integer
- $\varphi(n)$: Euler's totient function, which counts the positive integers coprime to (but not bigger than) $n$
- $\mu(n)$: the Möbius function, the parity ($-1$ for odd, $+1$ for even) of the number of prime factors of square-free numbers; $0$ if $n$ is not square-free
- $\sigma_k(n)$: the divisor function, which is the sum of the $k$-th powers of all the positive divisors of $n$ (where $k$ may be any complex number). As special cases we have
  - $\sigma_0(n)=d(n)$, the number of positive divisors of $n$,
  - $\sigma_1(n)=\sigma(n)$, the sum of all the positive divisors of $n$.
- $\sigma^*_k(n)$: the sum of the $k$-th powers of all unitary divisors of $n$

$$\sigma_k^*(n) \,=\!\!\sum_{d \,\mid\, n \atop \gcd(d,\,n/d)=1} \!\!\! d^k$$

- $\operatorname{rad}(n)$: the radical of $n$, which is the product of the distinct prime factors of $n$.
- $a(n)$: the number of non-isomorphic abelian groups of order $n$
- $\gamma(n)$, defined by $\gamma(n) = (-1)^{\omega(n)}$, where the additive function $\omega(n)$ is the number of distinct primes dividing $n$
- $\tau(n)$: the Ramanujan tau function
- All Dirichlet characters are completely multiplicative functions, for example
  - $(n/p)$, the Legendre symbol, considered as a function of $n$ where $p$ is a fixed prime number

An example of a non-multiplicative function is the arithmetic function $r_2(n)$, the number of representations of $n$ as a sum of squares of two integers, positive, negative, or zero, where in counting the number of ways, reversal of order is allowed. For example:

1 = 1^{2} + 0^{2} = (−1)^{2} + 0^{2} = 0^{2} + 1^{2} = 0^{2} + (−1)^{2}

and therefore $r_2(1)=4\neq 1$. This shows that the function is not multiplicative. However, $r_2(n)/4$ is multiplicative.

In the On-Line Encyclopedia of Integer Sequences, sequences of values of a multiplicative function have the keyword "mult".

See arithmetic function for some other examples of non-multiplicative functions.

== Properties ==
A multiplicative function is completely determined by its values at the powers of prime numbers, a consequence of the fundamental theorem of arithmetic. Thus, if n is a product of powers of distinct primes, say n = p^{a} q^{b} ..., then f(n) = f(p^{a}) f(q^{b}) ...

This property of multiplicative functions significantly reduces the need for computation, as in the following examples for n = 144 = 2^{4} · 3^{2}:
$$d(144) = \sigma_0(144) = \sigma_0(2^4) \, \sigma_0(3^2) = (1^0 + 2^0 + 4^0 + 8^0 + 16^0)(1^0 + 3^0 + 9^0) = 5 \cdot 3 = 15$$
$$\sigma(144) = \sigma_1(144) = \sigma_1(2^4) \, \sigma_1(3^2) = (1^1 + 2^1 + 4^1 + 8^1 + 16^1)(1^1 + 3^1 + 9^1) = 31 \cdot 13 = 403$$
$$\sigma^*(144) = \sigma^*(2^4) \, \sigma^*(3^2) = (1^1 + 16^1)(1^1 + 9^1) = 17 \cdot 10 = 170$$

Similarly, we have:
$$\varphi(144) = \varphi(2^4) \, \varphi(3^2) = 8 \cdot 6 = 48$$

In general, if f(n) is a multiplicative function and a, b are any two positive integers, then

f(a) · f(b) = f(gcd(a,b)) · f(lcm(a,b)).

The product of two multiplicative functions is also multiplicative.

Every completely multiplicative function is a homomorphism of monoids and is completely determined by its restriction to the prime numbers.

== Convolution ==
If f and g are two multiplicative functions, one defines a new multiplicative function $f * g$, the Dirichlet convolution of f and g, by
$$(f \, * \, g)(n) = \sum_{d|n} f(d) \, g \left( \frac{n}{d} \right)$$
where the sum extends over all positive divisors d of n. With this operation, the set of all multiplicative functions turns into an abelian group; the identity element is ε. Convolution is commutative, associative, and distributive over addition.

Relations among the multiplicative functions discussed above include:

- $\mu * 1 = \varepsilon$ (the Möbius inversion formula)
- $(\mu \operatorname{Id}_k) * \operatorname{Id}_k = \varepsilon$ (generalized Möbius inversion)
- $\varphi * 1 = \operatorname{Id}$
- $d = 1 * 1$
- $\sigma = \operatorname{Id} * 1 = \varphi * d$
- $\sigma_k = \operatorname{Id}_k * 1$
- $\operatorname{Id} = \varphi * 1 = \sigma * \mu$
- $\operatorname{Id}_k = \sigma_k * \mu$

The Dirichlet convolution can be defined for general arithmetic functions, and yields a ring structure, the Dirichlet ring.

The Dirichlet convolution of two multiplicative functions is again multiplicative. A proof of this fact is given by the following expansion for relatively prime $a,b \in \mathbb{Z}^{+}$:
$$\begin{align}
(f \ast g)(ab)
& = \sum_{d|ab} f(d) g\left(\frac{ab}{d}\right) \\
&= \sum_{d_1|a} \sum_{d_2|b} f(d_1d_2) g\left(\frac{ab}{d_1d_2}\right) \\
&= \sum_{d_1|a} f(d_1) g\left(\frac{a}{d_1}\right) \times \sum_{d_2|b} f(d_2) g\left(\frac{b}{d_2}\right) \\
&= (f \ast g)(a) \cdot (f \ast g)(b).
\end{align}$$

=== Dirichlet series for some multiplicative functions ===
- $\sum_{n\ge 1} \frac{\mu(n)}{n^s} = \frac{1}{\zeta(s)}$
- $\sum_{n\ge 1} \frac{\varphi(n)}{n^s} = \frac{\zeta(s-1)}{\zeta(s)}$
- $\sum_{n\ge 1} \frac{d(n)^2}{n^s} = \frac{\zeta(s)^4}{\zeta(2s)}$
- $\sum_{n\ge 1} \frac{2^{\omega(n)}}{n^s} = \frac{\zeta(s)^2}{\zeta(2s)}$

More examples are shown in the article on Dirichlet series.

== Rational arithmetical functions ==
An arithmetical function f is said to be a rational arithmetical function of order $(r, s)$ if there exists completely multiplicative functions g_{1},...,g_{r}, h_{1},...,h_{s} such that
$$f=g_1\ast\cdots\ast g_r\ast h_1^{-1}\ast\cdots\ast h_s^{-1},$$
where the inverses are with respect to the Dirichlet convolution. Rational arithmetical functions of order $(1, 1)$ are known as totient functions, and rational arithmetical functions of order $(2,0)$ are known as quadratic functions or specially multiplicative functions. Euler's function $\varphi(n)$ is a totient function, and the divisor function $\sigma_k(n)$ is a quadratic function. Completely multiplicative functions are rational arithmetical functions of order $(1,0)$. Liouville's function $\lambda(n)$ is completely multiplicative. The Möbius function $\mu(n)$ is a rational arithmetical function of order $(0, 1)$. By convention, the identity element $\varepsilon$ under the Dirichlet convolution is a rational arithmetical function of order $(0, 0)$.

All rational arithmetical functions are multiplicative. A multiplicative function f is a rational arithmetical function of order $(r, s)$ if and only if its Bell series is of the form
$${\displaystyle f_{p}(x)=\sum _{n=0}^{\infty }f(p^{n})x^{n}=
\frac{(1-h_1(p) x)(1-h_2(p) x)\cdots (1-h_s(p) x)}
{(1-g_1(p) x)(1-g_2(p) x)\cdots (1-g_r(p) x)}}$$
for all prime numbers $p$.

The concept of a rational arithmetical function originates from R. Vaidyanathaswamy (1931).

== Busche-Ramanujan identities ==
A multiplicative function $f$ is said to be specially multiplicative if there is a completely multiplicative function $f_A$ such that

$$f(m) f(n) = \sum_{d\mid (m,n)} f(mn/d^2) f_A(d)$$

for all positive integers $m$ and $n$, or equivalently

$$f(mn) = \sum_{d\mid (m,n)} f(m/d) f(n/d) \mu(d) f_A(d)$$

for all positive integers $m$ and $n$, where $\mu$ is the Möbius function. These are known as Busche-Ramanujan identities. In 1906, E. Busche stated the identity

$$\sigma_k(m) \sigma_k(n) = \sum_{d\mid (m,n)} \sigma_k(mn/d^2) d^k,$$

and, in 1915, S. Ramanujan gave the inverse form

$$\sigma_k(mn) = \sum_{d\mid (m,n)} \sigma_k(m/d) \sigma_k(n/d) \mu(d) d^k$$

for $k=0$. S. Chowla gave the inverse form for general $k$ in 1929, see P. J. McCarthy (1986). The study of Busche-Ramanujan identities begun from an attempt to better understand the special cases given by Busche and Ramanujan.

It is known that quadratic functions $f=g_1\ast g_2$ satisfy the Busche-Ramanujan identities with $f_A=g_1g_2$. Quadratic functions are exactly the same as specially multiplicative functions. Totients satisfy a restricted Busche-Ramanujan identity. For further details, see R. Vaidyanathaswamy (1931).

== Multiplicative function over F_{q}[X] ==
Let A = F_{q}[X], the polynomial ring over the finite field with q elements. A is a principal ideal domain and therefore A is a unique factorization domain.

A complex-valued function $\lambda$ on A is called multiplicative if $\lambda(fg)=\lambda(f)\lambda(g)$ whenever f and g are relatively prime.

=== Zeta function and Dirichlet series in F_{q}[X] ===
Let h be a polynomial arithmetic function (i.e. a function on set of monic polynomials over A). Its corresponding Dirichlet series is defined to be

$$D_h(s)=\sum_{f\text{ monic}}h(f)|f|^{-s},$$

where for $g\in A,$ set $|g|=q^{\deg(g)}$ if $g\ne 0,$ and $|g|=0$ otherwise.

The polynomial zeta function is then

$$\zeta_A(s)=\sum_{f\text{ monic}}|f|^{-s}.$$

Similar to the situation in N, every Dirichlet series of a multiplicative function h has a product representation (Euler product):

$$D_{h}(s)=\prod_P \left(\sum_{n\mathop =0}^{\infty}h(P^{n})|P|^{-sn}\right),$$

where the product runs over all monic irreducible polynomials P. For example, the product representation of the zeta function is as for the integers:

$$\zeta_A(s)=\prod_{P}(1-|P|^{-s})^{-1}.$$

Unlike the classical zeta function, $\zeta_A(s)$ is a simple rational function:

$$\zeta_A(s)=\sum_f |f|^{-s} = \sum_n\sum_{\deg(f)=n}q^{-sn}=\sum_n(q^{n-sn})=(1-q^{1-s})^{-1}.$$

In a similar way, If f and g are two polynomial arithmetic functions, one defines f * g, the Dirichlet convolution of f and g, by

$$\begin{align}
(f*g)(m)
&= \sum_{d \mid m} f(d)g\left(\frac{m}{d}\right) \\
&= \sum_{ab = m}f(a)g(b),
\end{align}$$

where the sum is over all monic divisors d of m, or equivalently over all pairs (a, b) of monic polynomials whose product is m. The identity $D_h D_g = D_{h*g}$ still holds.

== Multivariate ==
Multivariate functions can be constructed using multiplicative model estimators. Where a matrix function of A is defined as
$$D_N = N^2 \times N(N + 1) / 2$$

a sum can be distributed across the product
$$y_t = \sum(t/T)^{1/2}u_t = \sum(t/T)^{1/2}G_t^{1/2}\epsilon_t$$

For the efficient estimation of Σ(.), the following two nonparametric regressions can be considered:
$$\tilde{y}^2_t = \frac{y^2_t}{g_t} = \sigma^2(t/T) + \sigma^2(t/T)(\epsilon^2_t - 1),$$

and
$$y^2_t = \sigma^2(t/T) + \sigma^2(t/T)(g_t\epsilon^2_t - 1).$$

Thus it gives an estimate value of
$$L_t(\tau;u) = \sum_{t=1}^T K_h(u - t/T)\begin{bmatrix} ln\tau + \frac{y^2_t}{g_t\tau} \end{bmatrix}$$

with a local likelihood function for $y^2_t$ with known $g_t$ and unknown $\sigma^2(t/T)$.

== Generalizations ==
An arithmetical function $f$ is quasimultiplicative if there exists a nonzero constant $c$ such that $c\,f(mn)=f(m)f(n)$ for all positive integers $m, n$ with $(m, n)=1$. This concept originates by Lahiri (1972).

An arithmetical function $f$ is semimultiplicative if there exists a nonzero constant $c$, a positive integer $a$ and a multiplicative function $f_m$ such that $f(n)=c f_m(n/a)$ for all positive integers $n$ (under the convention that $f_m(x)=0$ if $x$ is not a positive integer.) This concept is due to David Rearick (1966).

An arithmetical function $f$ is Selberg multiplicative if for each prime $p$ there exists a function $f_p$ on nonnegative integers with $f_p(0)=1$ for all but finitely many primes $p$ such that $f(n)=\prod_{p} f_p(\nu_p(n))$ for all positive integers $n$, where $\nu_p(n)$ is the exponent of $p$ in the canonical factorization of $n$. See Selberg (1977).

It is known that the classes of semimultiplicative and Selberg multiplicative functions coincide. They both satisfy the arithmetical identity $f(m)f(n)=f((m, n))f([m, n])$ for all positive integers $m, n$. See Haukkanen (2012).

It is well known and easy to see that multiplicative functions are quasimultiplicative functions with $c=1$ and quasimultiplicative functions are semimultiplicative functions with $a=1$.

== See also ==
- Euler product
- Bell series
- Lambert series
