= Euler's totient function =

Number of integers coprime to and less than n

The first thousand values of φ(n). The points on the top line represent φ(p) when p is a prime number, which is p − 1.

In number theory, Euler's totient function counts the positive integers up to a given integer $n$ that are relatively prime to $n$. It is written using the Greek letter phi as $\varphi(n)$ or $\phi(n)$, and may also be called Euler's phi function. In other words, it is the number of integers $k$ in the range $1\leq k\leq n$ for which the greatest common divisor $\gcd(n,k)$ is equal to 1. The integers $k$ of this form are sometimes referred to as totatives of $n$.

For example, the totatives of $n=9$ are the six numbers 1, 2, 4, 5, 7 and 8. They are all relatively prime to 9, but the other three numbers in this range, 3, 6, and 9 are not, since $\gcd(9,3)=\gcd(9,6)=3$ and $\gcd(9,9)=9$. Therefore, $\varphi(9)=6$. As another example, $\varphi(1)=1$ since for $n=1$ the only integer in the range from 1 to $n$ is 1 itself, and $\gcd(1,1)=1$.

Euler's totient function is a multiplicative function, meaning that if two numbers $m$ and $n$ are relatively prime, then $\varphi(mn)=\varphi(m)\varphi(n)$. This function gives the order of the multiplicative group of integers modulo n (the group of units of the ring $\Z/n\Z$). It is also used for defining the RSA encryption system.

== History, terminology, and notation ==
Leonhard Euler introduced the function in 1763. However, he did not at that time choose any specific symbol to denote it. In a 1784 publication, Euler studied the function further, choosing the Greek letter $\pi$ to denote it: he wrote $\pi D$ for "the multitude of numbers less than $D$, and which have no common divisor with it". This definition varies from the current definition for the totient function at $D=1$ but is otherwise the same. The now-standard notation $\varphi(A)$ comes from Gauss's 1801 treatise Disquisitiones Arithmeticae, although Gauss did not use parentheses around the argument and wrote $\varphi A$. Thus, it is often called Euler's phi function or simply the phi function.

In 1879, J. J. Sylvester coined the term totient for this function, so it is also referred to as Euler's totient function, the Euler totient, or Euler's totient. Jordan's totient is a generalization of Euler's.

The cototient of $n$ is defined as $n-\varphi(n)$. It counts the number of positive integers less than or equal to $n$ that have at least one prime factor in common with $n$.

== Computing Euler's totient function ==
There are several formulae for computing $\varphi(n)$.

=== Euler's product formula ===
It states
$$\varphi(n) =n \prod_{p\mid n} \left(1-\frac{1}{p}\right),$$
where the product is over the distinct prime numbers dividing n.

An equivalent formulation is
$$\varphi(n) = p_1^{k_1-1}(p_1{-}1)\,p_2^{k_2-1}(p_2{-}1)\cdots p_r^{k_r-1}(p_r{-}1),$$
where $n = p_1^{k_1} p_2^{k_2} \cdots p_r^{k_r}$ is the prime factorization of $n$ (that is, $p_1, p_2,\ldots, p_r$ are distinct prime numbers).

The proof of these formulae depends on two important facts.

==== Phi is a multiplicative function ====
This means that if $\gcd(m,n) = 1$, then $\varphi(m) \varphi(n) = \varphi(mn)$. Proof outline: Let $A,B,C$ be the sets of positive integers which are coprime to and less than m, n, mn, respectively, so that $|A| = \varphi(m)$, etc. Then there is a bijection between $A\times B$ and C by the Chinese remainder theorem.

==== Value of phi for a prime power argument ====
If p is prime and $k\geq1$, then

$$\varphi \left(p^k\right) = p^k-p^{k-1} = p^{k-1}(p-1) = p^k \left( 1 - \tfrac{1}{p} \right).$$

Proof: Since p is a prime number, the only possible values of $\gcd(p^{k},m)$ are $1,p,p^{2},\dots,p^{k}$, and the only way to have $\gcd(p^{k},m)>1$ is if m is a multiple of p, that is, $m \in \{ p, 2p, 3p, \ldots, p^{k-1} p= p^{k}\}$, and there are $p^{k-1}$ such multiples not greater than $p^{k}$. Therefore, the other $p^{k}-p^{k-1}$ numbers are all relatively prime to $p^{k}$.

==== Proof of Euler's product formula ====
The fundamental theorem of arithmetic states that if n > 1 there is a unique expression $n = p_1^{k_1} p_2^{k_2} \cdots p_r^{k_r},$ where p_{1} < p_{2} < ... < p_{r} are prime numbers and each k_{i} ≥ 1. (The case n = 1 corresponds to the empty product.) Repeatedly using the multiplicative property of φ and the formula for φ(p^{k}) gives

$$\begin{array} {rcl}
\varphi(n)&=& \varphi(p_1^{k_1})\, \varphi(p_2^{k_2})
\cdots\varphi(p_r^{k_r})\\[.1em]
&=& p_1^{k_1} \left(1- \frac{1}{p_1} \right) p_2^{k_2} \left(1- \frac{1}{p_2} \right) \cdots p_r^{k_r}\left(1- \frac{1}{p_r} \right)\\[.1em]
&=& p_1^{k_1} p_2^{k_2} \cdots p_r^{k_r} \left(1- \frac{1}{p_1} \right) \left(1- \frac{1}{p_2} \right) \cdots \left(1- \frac{1}{p_r} \right)\\[.1em]
&=&n \left(1- \frac{1}{p_1} \right)\left(1- \frac{1}{p_2} \right) \cdots\left(1- \frac{1}{p_r} \right).
\end{array}$$

This gives both versions of Euler's product formula.

An alternative proof that does not require the multiplicative property instead uses the inclusion-exclusion principle applied to the set $\{1,2,\ldots,n\}$, excluding the sets of integers divisible by the prime divisors.

==== Example ====
$$\varphi(20)=\varphi(2^2 5)=20\,(1-\tfrac12)\,(1-\tfrac15)
=20\cdot\tfrac12\cdot\tfrac45=8.$$

In words: the distinct prime factors of 20 are 2 and 5; half of the twenty integers from 1 to 20 are divisible by 2, leaving ten; a fifth of those are divisible by 5, leaving eight numbers coprime to 20; these are: 1, 3, 7, 9, 11, 13, 17, 19.

The alternative formula uses only integers:
$$\varphi(20) = \varphi(2^2 5^1)= 2^{2-1}(2{-}1)\,5^{1-1}(5{-}1) = 2\cdot 1\cdot 1\cdot 4 = 8.$$

=== Fourier transform ===
The totient is the discrete Fourier transform of the gcd, evaluated at 1. Let

$$\mathcal{F} \{ \mathbf{x} \}[m] = \sum\limits_{k=1}^n x_k \cdot e^{{-2\pi i}\frac{mk}{n}}$$

where x_{k} = gcd(k,n) for k ∈ {1, ..., n}. Then

$$\varphi (n) = \mathcal{F} \{ \mathbf{x} \}[1] = \sum\limits_{k=1}^n \gcd(k,n) e^{-2\pi i\frac{k}{n}}.$$

The real part of this formula is

$$\varphi (n)=\sum\limits_{k=1}^n \gcd(k,n) \cos {\tfrac{2\pi k}{n}}
.$$

For example, using $\cos\tfrac{\pi}5 = \tfrac{\sqrt 5+1}4$ and $\cos\tfrac{2\pi}5 = \tfrac{\sqrt 5-1}4$:
$$\begin{array}{rcl}
\varphi(10) &=& \gcd(1,10)\cos\tfrac{2\pi}{10} + \gcd(2,10)\cos\tfrac{4\pi}{10}
+ \gcd(3,10)\cos\tfrac{6\pi}{10}+\cdots+\gcd(10,10)\cos\tfrac{20\pi}{10}\\
&=& 1\cdot(\tfrac{\sqrt5+1}4)  + 2\cdot(\tfrac{\sqrt5-1}4) +
1\cdot(-\tfrac{\sqrt5-1}4) + 2\cdot(-\tfrac{\sqrt5+1}4) + 5\cdot (-1) \\
&& +\  2\cdot(-\tfrac{\sqrt5+1}4) + 1\cdot(-\tfrac{\sqrt5-1}4) + 2\cdot(\tfrac{\sqrt5-1}4) +
1\cdot(\tfrac{\sqrt5+1}4) + 10 \cdot (1) \\
&=& 4 .
\end{array}$$
Unlike the Euler product and the divisor sum formula, this one does not require knowing the factors of n. However, it does involve the calculation of the greatest common divisor of n and every positive integer less than n, which suffices to provide the factorization anyway.

=== Divisor sum ===
The property established by Gauss, that

$$\sum_{d\mid n}\varphi(d)=n,$$

where the sum is over all positive divisors d of n, can be proven in several ways. (See Arithmetical function for notational conventions.)

One proof is to note that φ(d) is also equal to the number of possible generators of the cyclic group C_{d} ; specifically, if C_{d} = ⟨g⟩ with g^{d} = 1, then g^{k} is a generator for every k coprime to d. Since every element of C_{n} generates a cyclic subgroup, and each subgroup C_{d} ⊆ C_{n} is generated by precisely φ(d) elements of C_{n}, the formula follows. Equivalently, the formula can be derived by the same argument applied to the multiplicative group of the nth roots of unity and the primitive dth roots of unity.

The formula can also be derived from elementary arithmetic. For example, let n = 20 and consider the positive fractions up to 1 with denominator 20:
$$\tfrac{ 1}{20},\,\tfrac{ 2}{20},\,\tfrac{ 3}{20},\,\tfrac{ 4}{20},\,
\tfrac{ 5}{20},\,\tfrac{ 6}{20},\,\tfrac{ 7}{20},\,\tfrac{ 8}{20},\,
\tfrac{ 9}{20},\,\tfrac{10}{20},\,\tfrac{11}{20},\,\tfrac{12}{20},\,
\tfrac{13}{20},\,\tfrac{14}{20},\,\tfrac{15}{20},\,\tfrac{16}{20},\,
\tfrac{17}{20},\,\tfrac{18}{20},\,\tfrac{19}{20},\,\tfrac{20}{20}.$$

Put them into lowest terms:
$$\tfrac{ 1}{20},\,\tfrac{ 1}{10},\,\tfrac{ 3}{20},\,\tfrac{ 1}{ 5},\,
\tfrac{ 1}{ 4},\,\tfrac{ 3}{10},\,\tfrac{ 7}{20},\,\tfrac{ 2}{ 5},\,
\tfrac{ 9}{20},\,\tfrac{ 1}{ 2},\,\tfrac{11}{20},\,\tfrac{ 3}{ 5},\,
\tfrac{13}{20},\,\tfrac{ 7}{10},\,\tfrac{ 3}{ 4},\,\tfrac{ 4}{ 5},\,
\tfrac{17}{20},\,\tfrac{ 9}{10},\,\tfrac{19}{20},\,\tfrac{1}{1}$$

These twenty fractions are all the positive k/d ≤ 1 whose denominators are the divisors d = 1, 2, 4, 5, 10, 20. The fractions with 20 as denominator are those with numerators relatively prime to 20, namely 1/20, 3/20, 7/20, 9/20, 11/20, 13/20, 17/20, 19/20; by definition this is φ(20) fractions. Similarly, there are φ(10) fractions with denominator 10, and φ(5) fractions with denominator 5, etc. Thus the set of twenty fractions is split into subsets of size φ(d) for each d dividing 20. A similar argument applies for any n.

Möbius inversion applied to the divisor sum formula gives
$$\varphi(n) = \sum_{d\mid n} \mu\left( d \right) \cdot \frac{n}{d}  = n\sum_{d\mid n} \frac{\mu (d)}{d},$$

where μ is the Möbius function, the multiplicative function defined by $\mu(p) = -1$ and $\mu(p^k) = 0$ for each prime p and k ≥ 2. This formula may also be derived from the product formula by multiplying out $\prod_{p\mid n} (1 - \frac{1}{p})$ to get $\sum_{d \mid n} \frac{\mu (d)}{d}.$

An example:
$$\begin{align}
\varphi(20) &= \mu(1)\cdot 20 + \mu(2)\cdot 10 +\mu(4)\cdot 5 +\mu(5)\cdot 4 + \mu(10)\cdot 2+\mu(20)\cdot 1\\[.5em]
&= 1\cdot 20 - 1\cdot 10 + 0\cdot 5 - 1\cdot 4 + 1\cdot 2 + 0\cdot 1 = 8.
\end{align}$$

== Some values ==
The first 100 values (sequence A000010 in the OEIS) are shown in the table and graph below:

Graph of the first 100 values

φ(n) for 1 ≤ n ≤ 100
+	1	2	3	4	5	6	7	8	9	10
0	1	1	2	2	4	2	6	4	6	4
10	10	4	12	6	8	8	16	6	18	8
20	12	10	22	8	20	12	18	12	28	8
30	30	16	20	16	24	12	36	18	24	16
40	40	12	42	20	24	22	46	16	42	20
50	32	24	52	18	40	24	36	28	58	16
60	60	30	36	32	48	20	66	32	44	24
70	70	24	72	36	40	36	60	24	78	32
80	54	40	82	24	64	42	56	40	88	24
90	72	44	60	46	72	32	96	42	60	40

In the graph at right the top line y = n − 1 is an upper bound valid for all n other than one, and attained if and only if n is a prime number. A simple lower bound is $\varphi(n) \ge \sqrt{n/2}$, which is rather loose: in fact, the lower limit of the graph is proportional to n/(log log n).

== Euler's theorem ==
This states that if a and n are relatively prime then

$$a^{\varphi(n)} \equiv 1\mod n.$$

The special case where n is prime is known as Fermat's little theorem.

This follows from Lagrange's theorem and the fact that φ(n) is the order of the multiplicative group of integers modulo n.

The RSA cryptosystem is based on this theorem: it implies that the inverse of the function a ↦ a^{e} mod n, where e is the (public) encryption exponent, is the function b ↦ b^{d} mod n, where d, the (private) decryption exponent, is the multiplicative inverse of e modulo φ(n). The difficulty of computing φ(n) without knowing the factorization of n is thus the difficulty of computing d: this is known as the RSA problem which can be solved by factoring n. The owner of the private key knows the factorization, since an RSA private key is constructed by choosing n as the product of two (randomly chosen) large primes p and q. Only n is publicly disclosed, and given the difficulty to factor large numbers we have the guarantee that no one else knows the factorization.

== Other formulae ==
- $a\mid b \implies \varphi(a)\mid\varphi(b)$
- $m \mid \varphi(a^m-1)$
- $\varphi(mn) = \varphi(m)\varphi(n)\cdot\frac{d}{\varphi(d)} \quad\text{where }d = \operatorname{gcd}(m,n)$
  - In particular:
- $$\varphi(2m) = \begin{cases}
2\varphi(m) &\text{ if } m \text{ is even} \\
\varphi(m) &\text{ if } m \text{ is odd}
\end{cases}$$
- $\varphi\left(n^m\right) = n^{m-1}\varphi(n)$
- $\varphi(\operatorname{lcm}(m,n))\cdot\varphi(\operatorname{gcd}(m,n)) = \varphi(m)\cdot\varphi(n)$
  Compare this to the formula $\operatorname{lcm}(m,n)\cdot \operatorname{gcd}(m,n) = m \cdot n$ (see least common multiple).
- φ(n) is even for n ≥ 3.
  Moreover, if n has r distinct odd prime factors, 2^{r} | φ(n)
- For any a > 1 and n > 6 such that 4 ∤ n there exists an l ≥ 2n such that l | φ(a^{n} − 1).
- $\frac{\varphi(n)}{n}=\frac{\varphi(\operatorname{rad}(n))}{\operatorname{rad}(n)}$
  where rad(n) is the radical of n (the product of all distinct primes dividing n).
- $\sum_{d \mid n} \frac{\mu^2(d)}{\varphi(d)} = \frac{n}{\varphi(n)}$
- $\sum_{1\le k\le n-1 \atop gcd(k,n)=1}\!\!k = \tfrac12 n\varphi(n) \quad \text{for }n>1$
- $\sum_{k=1}^n\varphi(k) = \tfrac12 \left(1+ \sum_{k=1}^n \mu(k)\left\lfloor\frac{n}{k}\right\rfloor^2\right) =\frac3{\pi^2}n^2+O\left(n(\log n)^\frac23(\log\log n)^\frac43\right)$ ( cited in)
- $\sum_{k=1}^n\varphi(k) =\frac3{\pi^2}n^2+O\left(n(\log n)^\frac23(\log\log n)^\frac13\right)$ [Liu (2016)]
- $\sum_{k=1}^n\frac{\varphi(k)}{k} = \sum_{k=1}^n\frac{\mu(k)}{k}\left\lfloor\frac{n}{k}\right\rfloor=\frac6{\pi^2}n+O\left((\log n)^\frac23(\log\log n)^\frac43\right)$
- $\sum_{k=1}^n\frac{\varphi(k)}{k^2}=\frac{6}{\pi^2}\left(\log n + \gamma-\frac{\zeta'(2)}{\zeta(2)}\right)+O\left(\frac{\log n}{n}\right)=\frac{6}{\pi^2}\log\left(\frac{A^{12}}{2\pi}n\right)+O\left(\frac{\log n}{n}\right)$
- $\sum_{k=1}^n\frac{k}{\varphi(k)} = \frac{315\,\zeta(3)}{2\pi^4}n-\frac{\log n}2+O\left((\log n)^\frac23\right)$
- $\sum_{k=1}^n\frac{1}{\varphi(k)} = \frac{315\,\zeta(3)}{2\pi^4}\left(\log n+\gamma-\sum_{p\text{ prime}}\frac{\log p}{p^2-p+1}\right)+O\left(\frac{(\log n)^\frac23}n\right)$
  (where γ is the Euler–Mascheroni constant and A is the Glaisher-Kinkelin constant).

=== Menon's identity ===
In 1965 P. Kesava Menon proved
$$\sum_{\stackrel{1\le k\le n}{ \gcd(k,n)=1}} \!\!\!\! \gcd(k-1,n)=\varphi(n)d(n),$$
where d(n) = σ_{0}(n) is the number of divisors of n.

=== Divisibility by any fixed positive integer ===
The following property, which is unpublished as a specific result but has long been known, has important consequences. For instance it rules out uniform distribution of the values of $\varphi(n)$ in the arithmetic progressions modulo $q$ for any integer $q>1$.

- For every fixed positive integer $q$, the relation $q|\varphi(n)$ holds for almost all $n$, meaning for all but $o(x)$ values of $n\le x$ as $x\rightarrow\infty$.

This is an elementary consequence of the fact that the sum of the reciprocals of the primes congruent to 1 modulo $q$ diverges, which itself is a corollary of the proof of Dirichlet's theorem on arithmetic progressions.

== Generating functions ==
The Dirichlet series for φ(n) may be written in terms of the Riemann zeta function as:
$$\sum_{n=1}^\infty \frac{\varphi(n)}{n^s}=\frac{\zeta(s-1)}{\zeta(s)}$$
where the left-hand side converges for $\Re (s)>2$.

The Lambert series generating function is

$$\sum_{n=1}^{\infty} \frac{\varphi(n) q^n}{1-q^n}= \frac{q}{(1-q)^2}$$

which converges for |q| < 1.

Both of these are proved by elementary series manipulations and the formulae for φ(n).

== Growth rate ==
In the words of Hardy & Wright, the order of φ(n) is "always 'nearly n'."

First

$$\lim\sup \frac{\varphi(n)}{n}= 1,$$

but as n goes to infinity, for all δ > 0

$$\frac{\varphi(n)}{n^{1-\delta}}\rightarrow\infty.$$

These two formulae can be proved by using little more than the formulae for φ(n) and the divisor sum function σ(n).

In fact, during the proof of the second formula, the inequality

$$\frac {6}{\pi^2} < \frac{\varphi(n) \sigma(n)}{n^2} < 1,$$

true for n > 1, is proved.

We also have

$$\lim\inf\frac{\varphi(n)}{n}\log\log n = e^{-\gamma}.$$

Here γ is Euler's constant, γ = 0.577215665..., so e^{γ} = 1.7810724... and e^{−γ} = 0.56145948....

Proving this does not quite require the prime number theorem. Since log log n goes to infinity, this formula shows that

$$\lim\inf\frac{\varphi(n)}{n}= 0.$$

In fact, more is true.

$$\varphi(n) > \frac {n} {e^\gamma\; \log \log n + \frac {3} {\log \log n}} \quad\text{for } n>2$$

and

$$\varphi(n) < \frac {n} {e^{ \gamma}\log \log n} \quad\text{for infinitely many } n.$$

The second inequality was shown by Jean-Louis Nicolas. Ribenboim says "The method of proof is interesting, in that the inequality is shown first under the assumption that the Riemann hypothesis is true, secondly under the contrary assumption."

For the average order, we have

$$\varphi(1)+\varphi(2)+\cdots+\varphi(n) = \frac{3n^2}{\pi^2}+O\left(n(\log n)^\frac23(\log\log n)^\frac43\right) \quad\text{as }n\rightarrow\infty,$$
due to Arnold Walfisz, its proof exploiting estimates on exponential sums due to I. M. Vinogradov and N. M. Korobov. By a combination of van der Corput's and Vinogradov's methods, H.-Q. Liu (On Euler's function.Proc. Roy. Soc. Edinburgh Sect. A 146 (2016), no. 4, 769–775) improved the error term to
$$O\left(n(\log n)^\frac23(\log\log n)^\frac13\right)$$
(this is currently the best known estimate of this type). The "Big O" stands for a quantity that is bounded by a constant times the function of n inside the parentheses (which is small compared to n^{2}).

This result can be used to prove that the probability of two randomly chosen numbers being relatively prime is 6/π^{2}.

== Ratio of consecutive values ==
In 1950 Somayajulu proved

$$\begin{align}
\lim\inf \frac{\varphi(n+1)}{\varphi(n)}&= 0 \quad\text{and} \\[5px]
\lim\sup \frac{\varphi(n+1)}{\varphi(n)}&= \infty.
\end{align}$$

In 1954 Schinzel and Sierpiński strengthened this, proving that the set

$$\left\{\frac{\varphi(n+1)}{\varphi(n)},\;\;n = 1,2,\ldots\right\}$$

is dense in the positive real numbers. They also proved that the set

$$\left\{\frac{\varphi(n)}{n},\;\;n = 1,2,\ldots\right\}$$

is dense in the interval (0,1).

== Totient number ==
A totient number is a value of Euler's totient function: that is, an m for which there is at least one n for which φ(n) = m. The valency or multiplicity of a totient number m is the number of solutions to this equation. A nontotient is a natural number which is not a totient number. Every odd integer exceeding 1 is trivially a nontotient. There are also infinitely many even nontotients, and indeed every positive integer has a multiple which is an even nontotient.

The first few totient numbers are $1, 2, 4, 6, 8, 10, 12, 16, 18, 20$, see sequence A002202.

The number of totient numbers up to a given limit x is

$$\frac{x}{\log x}e^{ \big(C+o(1)\big)(\log\log\log x)^2 }$$

for a constant C = 0.8178146....

If counted accordingly to multiplicity, the number of totient numbers up to a given limit x is

$$\Big\vert\{ n : \varphi(n) \le x \}\Big\vert = \frac{\zeta(2)\zeta(3)}{\zeta(6)} \cdot x + R(x)$$

where the error term R is of order at most x/((log x)^{k}) for any positive k.

It is known that the multiplicity of m exceeds m^{δ} infinitely often for any δ < 0.55655.

=== Ford's theorem ===
Ford (1999) proved that for every integer k ≥ 2 there is a totient number m of multiplicity k: that is, for which the equation φ(n) = m has exactly k solutions; this result had previously been conjectured by Wacław Sierpiński, and it had been obtained as a consequence of Schinzel's hypothesis H. Indeed, each multiplicity that occurs, does so infinitely often.

However, no number m is known with multiplicity k = 1. Carmichael's totient function conjecture is the statement that there is no such m.

=== Perfect totient numbers ===
A perfect totient number is an integer that is equal to the sum of its iterated totients. That is, we apply the totient function to a number n, apply it again to the resulting totient, and so on, until the number 1 is reached, and add together the resulting sequence of numbers; if the sum equals n, then n is a perfect totient number.

== Applications ==
=== Cyclotomy ===
In the last section of the Disquisitiones Gauss proves that a regular n-gon can be constructed with straightedge and compass if φ(n) is a power of 2. If n is a power of an odd prime number the formula for the totient says its totient can be a power of two only if n is a first power and n − 1 is a power of 2. The primes that are one more than a power of 2 are called Fermat primes, and only five are known: 3, 5, 17, 257, and 65537. Fermat and Gauss knew of these. Nobody has been able to prove whether there are any more.

Thus, a regular n-gon has a straightedge-and-compass construction if n is a product of distinct Fermat primes and any power of 2. The first few such n are

2, 3, 4, 5, 6, 8, 10, 12, 15, 16, 17, 20, 24, 30, 32, 34, 40,... (sequence A003401 in the OEIS).

=== The RSA cryptosystem ===
Setting up an RSA cryptosystem involves choosing large prime numbers p and q, computing n = pq and k = φ(n), and finding two numbers e and d such that ed ≡ 1 (mod k). The numbers n and e (the "encryption key") are released to the public, and d (the "decryption key") is kept private.

A message, represented by an integer m, where 0 < m < n, is encrypted by computing S = m^{e} (mod n).

It is decrypted by computing t = S^{d} (mod n). Euler's Theorem can be used to show that if 0 < t < n, then t = m.

The security of an RSA system would be compromised if the number n could be efficiently factored or if φ(n) could be efficiently computed without factoring n.

== Unsolved problems ==
=== Lehmer's conjecture ===
If p is prime, then φ(p) = p − 1. In 1932 D. H. Lehmer asked if there are any composite numbers n such that φ(n) divides n − 1. None are known.

In 1933 he proved that if any such n exists, it must be odd, square-free, and divisible by at least seven primes (i.e. ω(n) ≥ 7). In 1980 Cohen and Hagis proved that n > 10^{20} and that ω(n) ≥ 14. Further, Hagis showed that if 3 divides n then n > 10^{1937042} and ω(n) ≥ 298848.

=== Carmichael's conjecture ===
This states that there is no number $n$ with the property that for all other numbers $m$, $m\neq n$, $\varphi(m) \neq \varphi(n)$. See Ford's theorem above.

If there is a single counterexample to this conjecture, there must be infinitely many counterexamples, and the smallest one has at least ten billion digits in base 10.

=== Riemann hypothesis ===
The Riemann hypothesis is true if and only if the inequality
$$\frac{n}{\varphi (n)}<e^\gamma \log\log n+\frac{e^\gamma (4+\gamma-\log 4\pi)}{\sqrt{\log n}}$$
is true for all $n\geq p_{120569}\#$ where $\gamma$ is Euler's constant and $p_{120569}\#$ is the product of the first 120569 primes.

== See also ==
- Carmichael function (λ)
- Dedekind psi function (𝜓)
- Divisor function (σ)
- Duffin–Schaeffer conjecture
- Generalizations of Fermat's little theorem
- Highly composite number
- Multiplicative group of integers modulo n
- Ramanujan sum
- Totient summatory function (𝛷)
