= Root of unity modulo n =

In mathematics, a kth root of unity modulo n for positive integers k, n ≥ 2, is a root of unity in the ring of integers modulo n; that is, a solution x to the equation (or congruence) $x^k \equiv 1 \pmod{n}$. If k is the smallest such exponent for x, then x is called a primitive kth root of unity modulo n. See modular arithmetic for notation and terminology.

The roots of unity modulo n are exactly the integers that are coprime with n. In fact, these integers are roots of unity modulo n by Euler's theorem, and the other integers cannot be roots of unity modulo n, because they are zero divisors modulo n.

A primitive root modulo n, is a generator of the group of units of the ring of integers modulo n. There exist primitive roots modulo n if and only if $\lambda(n)=\varphi(n),$ where $\lambda$ and $\varphi$ are respectively the Carmichael function and Euler's totient function.

A root of unity modulo n is a primitive kth root of unity modulo n for some divisor k of $\lambda(n),$ and, conversely, there are primitive kth roots of unity modulo n if and only if k is a divisor of $\lambda(n).$

== Roots of unity ==
=== Properties ===
- If x is a kth root of unity modulo n, then x is a unit (invertible) whose inverse is $x^{k-1}$. That is, x and n are coprime.
- If x is a unit, then it is a (primitive) kth root of unity modulo n, where k is the multiplicative order of x modulo n.
- If x is a kth root of unity and $x-1$ is not a zero divisor, then $\sum_{j=0}^{k-1} x^j \equiv 0 \pmod{n}$, because

$$(x-1)\cdot\sum_{j=0}^{k-1} x^j \equiv x^k-1 \equiv 0 \pmod{n}.$$

=== Number of kth roots ===
For the lack of a widely accepted symbol, we denote the number of kth roots of unity modulo n by $f(n,k)$. It satisfies a number of properties:

- $f(n,1) = 1$ for $n\ge2$
- $f(n,\lambda(n)) = \varphi(n)$ where λ denotes the Carmichael function and $\varphi$ denotes Euler's totient function
- $n \mapsto f(n,k)$ is a multiplicative function
- $k\mid\ell \implies f(n,k)\mid f(n,\ell)$ where the bar denotes divisibility
- $f(n,\operatorname{lcm}(a,b)) = \operatorname{lcm}(f(n,a),f(n,b))$ where $\operatorname{lcm}$ denotes the least common multiple
- For prime $p$, $\forall i\in\mathbb{N}\ \exists j\in\mathbb{N}\ f(n,p^i) = p^j$. The precise mapping from $i$ to $j$ is not known. If it were known, then together with the previous law it would yield a way to evaluate $f$ quickly.

=== Examples ===
Let $n = 7$ and $k = 3$. In this case, there are three cube roots of unity (1, 2, and 4). When $n = 11$ however, there is only one cube root of unity, the unit 1 itself. This behavior is quite different from the field of complex numbers where every nonzero number has k kth roots.

== Primitive roots of unity ==
=== Properties ===
- The maximum possible radix exponent for primitive roots modulo $n$ is $\lambda(n)$, where λ denotes the Carmichael function.
- A radix exponent for a primitive root of unity is a divisor of $\lambda(n)$.
- Every divisor $k$ of $\lambda(n)$ yields a primitive $k$th root of unity. One can obtain such a root by choosing a $\lambda(n)$th primitive root of unity (that must exist by definition of λ), named $x$ and compute the power $x^{\lambda(n)/k}$.
- If x is a primitive kth root of unity and also a (not necessarily primitive) ℓth root of unity, then k is a divisor of ℓ. This is true, because Bézout's identity yields an integer linear combination of k and ℓ equal to $\gcd(k,\ell)$. Since k is minimal, it must be $k = \gcd(k,\ell)$ and $\gcd(k,\ell)$ is a divisor of ℓ.

=== Number of primitive kth roots ===
For the lack of a widely accepted symbol, we denote the number of primitive kth roots of unity modulo n by $g(n,k)$. It satisfies the following properties:

- $$g(n,k) = \begin{cases} >0 &\text{if } k\mid\lambda(n), \\ 0 & \text{otherwise}. \end{cases}$$
- Consequently the function $k \mapsto g(n,k)$ has $d(\lambda(n))$ values different from zero, where $d$ computes the number of divisors.
- $g(n,1) = 1$
- $g(4,2) = 1$
- $g(2^n,2) = 3$ for $n \ge 3$, since -1 is always a square root of 1.
- $g(2^n,2^k) = 2^k$ for $k \in [2,n-1)$
- $g(n,2) = 1$ for $n \ge 3$ and $n$ in (sequence A033948 in the OEIS)
- $\sum_{k\in\mathbb{N}} g(n,k) = f(n,\lambda(n)) = \varphi(n)$ with $\varphi$ being Euler's totient function
- The connection between $f$ and $g$ can be written in an elegant way using a Dirichlet convolution:

$f = \mathbf{1} * g$, i.e. $f(n,k) = \sum_{d\mid k} g(n,d)$

One can compute values of $g$ recursively from $f$ using this formula, which is equivalent to the Möbius inversion formula.

=== Testing whether x is a primitive kth root of unity modulo n ===
By fast exponentiation, one can check that $x^k \equiv 1 \pmod{n}$. If this is true, x is a kth root of unity modulo n but not necessarily primitive. If it is not a primitive root, then there would be some divisor ℓ of k, with $x^{\ell} \equiv 1 \pmod{n}$. In order to exclude this possibility, one has only to check for a few ℓ's equal k divided by a prime.

That is, x is a primitive kth root of unity modulo n if and only if $x^k \equiv 1 \pmod{n}$ and
$$x^{k/p} \not\equiv 1 \pmod{n}$$
for every prime divisor p of n.

For example, if $n=17,$ every positive integer less than 17 is a 16th root of unity modulo 17, and the integers that are primitive 16th roots of unity modulo 17 are exactly those such that
$$x^{16/2} \not\equiv 1 \pmod{17}.$$

=== Finding a primitive kth root of unity modulo n ===
Among the primitive kth roots of unity, the primitive $\lambda(n)$th roots are most frequent. It is thus recommended to try some integers for being a primitive $\lambda(n)$th root, what will succeed quickly. For a primitive $\lambda(n)$th root x, the number $x^{\lambda(n)/k}$ is a primitive $k$th root of unity. If k does not divide $\lambda(n)$, then there will be no kth roots of unity, at all.

=== Finding multiple primitive kth roots modulo n ===
Once a primitive kth root of unity x is obtained, every power $x^\ell$ is a $k$th root of unity, but not necessarily a primitive one. The power $x^\ell$ is a primitive $k$th root of unity if and only if $k$ and $\ell$ are coprime. The proof is as follows: If $x^\ell$ is not primitive, then there exists a divisor $m$ of $k$ with $(x^\ell)^m \equiv 1 \pmod n$, and since $k$ and $\ell$ are coprime, there exists integers $a,b$ such that $ak+b\ell=1$. This yields

$x^m\equiv (x^m)^{ak+b\ell}\equiv (x^k)^{ma} ((x^{\ell})^m)^b \equiv 1 \pmod n$,

which means that $x$ is not a primitive $k$th root of unity because there is the smaller exponent $m$.

That is, by exponentiating x one can obtain $\varphi(k)$ different primitive kth roots of unity, but these may not be all such roots. However, finding all of them is not so easy.

=== Finding an n with a primitive kth root of unity modulo n ===
A motivating question is, in what integer residue class rings does a primitive kth root of unity exist? It can be used to compute a discrete Fourier transform (more precisely a number theoretic transform) of a $k$-dimensional integer vector. In order to perform the inverse transform, divide by $k$; that is, k is also a unit modulo $n.$

A simple way to find such an n is to check for primitive kth roots with respect to the moduli in the arithmetic progression $k+1, 2k+1, 3k+1, \dots$ All of these moduli are coprime to k and thus k is a unit. According to Dirichlet's theorem on arithmetic progressions there are infinitely many primes in the progression, and for a prime $p$, it holds $\lambda(p) = p-1$. Thus if $mk+1$ is prime, then $\lambda(mk+1) = mk$, and thus there are primitive kth roots of unity. But the test for primes is too strong, and there may be other appropriate moduli.

=== Finding an n with multiple primitive roots of unity modulo n ===
To find a modulus $n$ such that there are primitive $k_1\text{th}, k_2\text{th},\ldots,k_m\text{th}$ roots of unity modulo $n$, the following theorem reduces the problem to a simpler one:

For given $n$ there are primitive $k_1\text{th}, \ldots, k_m\text{th}$ roots of unity modulo $n$ if and only if there is a primitive $\operatorname{lcm}(k_1, \ldots, k_m)$th root of unity modulo n.

Proof

Backward direction: If there is a primitive $\operatorname{lcm}(k_1, \ldots, k_m)$th root of unity modulo $n$ called $x$, then $x^{\operatorname{lcm}(k_1, \ldots, k_m)/k_l}$ is a $k_l$th root of unity modulo $n$.

Forward direction: If there are primitive $k_1\text{th}, \ldots, k_m\text{th}$ roots of unity modulo $n$, then all exponents $k_1, \dots, k_m$ are divisors of $\lambda(n)$. This implies $\operatorname{lcm}(k_1, \dots, k_m) \mid \lambda(n)$ and this in turn means there is a primitive $\operatorname{lcm}(k_1, \ldots, k_m)$th root of unity modulo $n$.
