= Repeating decimal =

Decimal representation of a number whose digits are periodic

A repeating decimal or recurring decimal is a decimal representation of a number whose digits are eventually periodic (that is, after some place, the same sequence of digits is repeated forever); if this sequence consists only of zeros (that is if there are only a finite number of nonzero digits), the decimal is said to be terminating, and is not considered as repeating.

It can be shown that a number is rational if and only if its decimal representation is repeating or terminating. For example, the decimal representation of 1/3 becomes periodic just after the decimal point, repeating the single digit "3" forever, i.e. 0.333.... A more complicated example is 3227/555, whose decimal becomes periodic at the second digit following the decimal point and then repeats the sequence "144" forever, i.e. 5.8144144144.... Another example of this is 593/53, which becomes periodic after the decimal point, repeating the 13-digit pattern "1886792452830" forever, i.e. 11.18867924528301886792452830....

The finite digit sequence that is repeated infinitely is called the repetend or reptend. If the repetend is a zero, this decimal representation is called a terminating decimal rather than a repeating decimal, since the zeros can be omitted and the decimal terminates before these zeros. Every terminating decimal representation can be written as a decimal fraction, a fraction whose denominator is a power of 10 (e.g. 1.585 = 1585/1000); it may also be written as a ratio of the form k/2^{n}·5^{m} (e.g. 1.585 = 317/2^{3}·5^{2}). However, every number with a terminating decimal representation also trivially has a second, alternative representation as a repeating decimal whose repetend is the digit "9". This is obtained by decreasing the final (rightmost) non-zero digit by one and appending a repetend of 9. Two examples of this are 1.000... = 0.999... and 1.585000... = 1.584999.... (This type of repeating decimal can be obtained by long division if one uses a modified form of the usual division algorithm.)

Any number that cannot be expressed as a ratio of two integers is said to be irrational. Their decimal representation neither terminates nor infinitely repeats, but extends forever without repetition (see § Every rational number is either a terminating or repeating decimal). Examples of such irrational numbers are √2 and π.

== Background ==
=== Notation ===
Any textual representation is necessarily finite, which is why special non-decimal notation is required to represent repeating decimals. Below are several notational conventions. None of them are accepted universally.

Different notations with examples
Fraction		Vinculum	Dots	Parentheses	Arc	Ellipsis	"r" notation
1/9		0.1̅	0.	0.(1)	0.1	0.111...	0r1
1/3	= 3/9	0.3̅	0.	0.(3)	0.3	0.333...	0r3
2/3	= 6/9	0.6̅	0.	0.(6)	0.6	0.666...	0r6
9/11	= 81/99	0.8̅1̅	0.	0.(81)	0.81	0.8181...	0r81
7/12	= 525/900	0.583̅	0.58	0.58(3)	0.583	0.58333...	0.58r3
1/7	= 142857/999999	0.1̅4̅2̅8̅5̅7̅	0.4285	0.(142857)	0.142857	0.142857142857...	0r142857
1/81	= 12345679/999999999	0.0̅1̅2̅3̅4̅5̅6̅7̅9̅	0.1234567	0.(012345679)	0.012345679	0.012345679012345679...	0r012345679
22/7	= 3142854/999999	3.1̅4̅2̅8̅5̅7̅	3.4285	3.(142857)	3.142857	3.142857142857...	3r142857
593/53	= 111886792452819/9999999999999	11.1̅8̅8̅6̅7̅9̅2̅4̅5̅2̅8̅3̅0̅	11.88679245283	11.(1886792452830)	11.1886792452830	11.18867924528301886792452830...	11r1886792452830

- Vinculum: In the United States, Canada, India, France, Germany, Denmark, the Netherlands, Italy, Switzerland, the Czech Republic, Slovakia, Slovenia, Chile, Taiwan, and Turkey, the convention is to draw a horizontal line (a vinculum) above the repetend.
- Dots: In some Islamic countries, such as Bangladesh, Malaysia, Morocco, Pakistan, Tunisia, Iran, Algeria and Egypt, as well as the United Kingdom, New Zealand, Australia, South Africa, Japan, Thailand, India, South Korea, Singapore, and the People's Republic of China, the convention is to place dots above the outermost numerals of the repetend.
- Parentheses: In parts of Europe, incl. Austria, Finland, Norway, Poland, Russia and Ukraine, as well as Vietnam and Israel, the convention is to enclose the repetend in parentheses. This can cause confusion with the notation for standard uncertainty or multiplication.
- Arc: In Spain and some Latin American countries, such as Argentina, Brazil, and Mexico, the arc notation over the repetend is also used as an alternative to the vinculum and the dots notation.
- Ellipsis: Informally, repeating decimals are often represented by an ellipsis (three periods, 0.333...), especially when the previous notational conventions are first taught in school. This notation introduces uncertainty as to which digits should be repeated and even whether repetition is occurring at all, since such ellipses are also employed for irrational numbers; π, for example, can be represented as 3.14159....
- "r" notation: In online settings or informal writing, where notating any of the above may be impossible, a simple way of writing repeated numbers is to place an r at the start of the repetition. For example, 1.23̅4̅ can be written 1.2r34. In cases where the repetition starts at the decimal, the decimal point can be omitted, so 11.1̅8̅8̅6̅7̅9̅2̅4̅5̅2̅8̅3̅0̅ would be 11r1886792452830.

In English, there are various ways to read repeating decimals aloud. For example, 1.23̅4̅ may be read "one point two repeating three four", "one point two repeated three four", "one point two recurring three four", "one point two repetend three four" or "one point two into infinity three four".

=== Decimal expansion and recurrence sequence ===
In order to convert a rational number represented as a fraction into decimal form, one may use long division. For example, consider the rational number 5/74:

        0.0675
   74 ) 5.00000
        4.44
          560
          518
           420
           370
            500

etc. Observe that at each step we have a remainder; the successive remainders displayed above are 56, 42, 50. When we arrive at 50 as the remainder, and bring down the "0", we find ourselves dividing 500 by 74, which is the same problem we began with. Therefore, the decimal repeats: 0.0675675675....

For any integer fraction A/B, the remainder at step k, for any positive integer k, is A × 10^{k} (modulo B).

=== Every rational number is either a terminating or repeating decimal ===
For any given divisor, only finitely many different remainders can occur. In the example above, the 74 possible remainders are 0, 1, 2, ..., 73. If at any point in the division the remainder is 0, the expansion terminates at that point. Then the length of the repetend, also called "period", is defined to be 0.

If 0 never occurs as a remainder, then the division process continues forever, and eventually, a remainder must occur that has occurred before. The next step in the division will yield the same new digit in the quotient, and the same new remainder, as the previous time the remainder was the same. Therefore, the following division will repeat the same results. The repeating sequence of digits is called "repetend" which has a certain length greater than 0, also called "period".

In base 10, a fraction has a repeating decimal if and only if in lowest terms, its denominator has at least a prime factor different from 2 and 5 (a prime denominator is considered as a prime factor of itself), or in other words, the denominator cannot be expressed as 2^{m}5^{n}, where m and n are non-negative integers.

=== Every repeating or terminating decimal is a rational number ===
Each repeating decimal number satisfies a linear equation with integer coefficients, and its unique solution is a rational number. In the example above, α = 5.8144144144... satisfies the equation

10000α − 10α	= 58144.144144... − 58.144144...
9990α	= 58086
Therefore, α	= 58086/9990 = 3227/555

The process of how to find these integer coefficients is described below.

==== Formal proof ====
Given a repeating decimal $x=a.b\overline{c}$ where $a$, $b$, and $c$ are groups of digits, let $n=\lceil{\log_{10}b}\rceil$, the number of digits of $b$. Multiplying by $10^n$ separates the repeating and terminating groups:

$10^nx=ab.\bar{c} .$

If the decimals terminate ($c=0$), the proof is complete. For $c\neq0$ with $k\in\mathbb{N}$ digits, let $x=y. \bar{c}$ where $y\in\mathbb{Z}$ is a terminating group of digits. Then,

$c=d_1 d_2\,...d_k$

where $d_i$ denotes the i-th digit, and

$x=y+\sum_{n=1}^\infty \frac{c}{{(10^k)}^n}= y +\left(c\sum_{n=0}^\infty \frac{1}{{(10^k)}^n}\right)-c .$

Since $\textstyle \sum_{n=0}^\infty \frac{1}{{(10^k)}^n} = \frac{1}{1-10^{-k}}$,

$x=y -c+\frac{10^k c }{10^k-1} .$

Since $x$ is the sum of an integer ($y -c$) and a rational number ($\frac{10^kc}{10^k-1}$), $x$ is also rational.

== Fractions with prime denominators ==
A fraction in lowest terms with a prime denominator other than 2 or 5 (i.e. coprime to 10) always produces a repeating decimal. The length of the repetend (period of the repeating decimal segment) of 1/p is equal to the order of 10 modulo p. If 10 is a primitive root modulo p, then the repetend length is equal to p − 1; if not, then the repetend length is a factor of p − 1. This result can be deduced from Fermat's little theorem, which states that 10^{p−1} ≡ 1 (mod p).

The base-10 digital root of the repetend of the reciprocal of any prime number greater than 5 is 9.

If the repetend length of 1/p for prime p is equal to p − 1 then the repetend, expressed as an integer, is called a cyclic number.

=== Cyclic numbers ===
Examples of fractions belonging to this group are:

- 1/7 = 0.1̅4̅2̅8̅5̅7̅, 6 repeating digits
- 1/17 = 0.0̅5̅8̅8̅2̅3̅5̅2̅9̅4̅1̅1̅7̅6̅4̅7̅, 16 repeating digits
- 1/19 = 0.0̅5̅2̅6̅3̅1̅5̅7̅8̅9̅4̅7̅3̅6̅8̅4̅2̅1̅, 18 repeating digits
- 1/23 = 0.0̅4̅3̅4̅7̅8̅2̅6̅0̅8̅6̅9̅5̅6̅5̅2̅1̅7̅3̅9̅1̅3̅, 22 repeating digits
- 1/29 = 0.0̅3̅4̅4̅8̅2̅7̅5̅8̅6̅2̅0̅6̅8̅9̅6̅5̅5̅1̅7̅2̅4̅1̅3̅7̅9̅3̅1̅, 28 repeating digits
- 1/47 = 0.0̅2̅1̅2̅7̅6̅5̅9̅5̅7̅4̅4̅6̅8̅0̅8̅5̅1̅0̅6̅3̅8̅2̅9̅7̅8̅7̅2̅3̅4̅0̅4̅2̅5̅5̅3̅1̅9̅1̅4̅8̅9̅3̅6̅1̅7̅, 46 repeating digits
- 1/59 = 0.0̅1̅6̅9̅4̅9̅1̅5̅2̅5̅4̅2̅3̅7̅2̅8̅8̅1̅3̅5̅5̅9̅3̅2̅2̅0̅3̅3̅8̅9̅8̅3̅0̅5̅0̅8̅4̅7̅4̅5̅7̅6̅2̅7̅1̅1̅8̅6̅4̅4̅0̅6̅7̅7̅9̅6̅6̅1̅, 58 repeating digits
- 1/61 = 0.0̅1̅6̅3̅9̅3̅4̅4̅2̅6̅2̅2̅9̅5̅0̅8̅1̅9̅6̅7̅2̅1̅3̅1̅1̅4̅7̅5̅4̅0̅9̅8̅3̅6̅0̅6̅5̅5̅7̅3̅7̅7̅0̅4̅9̅1̅8̅0̅3̅2̅7̅8̅6̅8̅8̅5̅2̅4̅5̅9̅, 60 repeating digits
- 1/97 = 0.0̅1̅0̅3̅0̅9̅2̅7̅8̅3̅5̅0̅5̅1̅5̅4̅6̅3̅9̅1̅7̅5̅2̅5̅7̅7̅3̅1̅9̅5̅8̅7̅6̅2̅8̅8̅6̅5̅9̅7̅9̅3̅8̅1̅4̅4̅3̅2̅9̅8̅9̅6̅9̅0̅7̅2̅1̅6̅4̅9̅4̅8̅4̅5̅3̅6̅0̅8̅2̅4̅7̅4̅2̅2̅6̅8̅0̅4̅1̅2̅3̅7̅1̅1̅3̅4̅0̅2̅0̅6̅1̅8̅5̅5̅6̅7̅, 96 repeating digits

The list can go on to include the fractions 1/109, 1/113, 1/131, 1/149, 1/167, 1/179, 1/181, 1/193, 1/223, 1/229, etc. (sequence A001913 in the OEIS).

Every proper multiple of a cyclic number (that is, a multiple having the same number of digits) is a rotation:

- 1/7 = 1 × 0.1̅4̅2̅8̅5̅7̅ = 0.1̅4̅2̅8̅5̅7̅
- 2/7 = 2 × 0.1̅4̅2̅8̅5̅7̅ = 0.2̅8̅5̅7̅1̅4̅
- 3/7 = 3 × 0.1̅4̅2̅8̅5̅7̅ = 0.4̅2̅8̅5̅7̅1̅
- 4/7 = 4 × 0.1̅4̅2̅8̅5̅7̅ = 0.5̅7̅1̅4̅2̅8̅
- 5/7 = 5 × 0.1̅4̅2̅8̅5̅7̅ = 0.7̅1̅4̅2̅8̅5̅
- 6/7 = 6 × 0.1̅4̅2̅8̅5̅7̅ = 0.8̅5̅7̅1̅4̅2̅

The reason for the cyclic behavior is apparent from an arithmetic exercise of long division of 1/7: the sequential remainders are the cyclic sequence {1, 3, 2, 6, 4, 5}. See also the article 142,857 for more properties of this cyclic number.

A fraction which is cyclic thus has a recurring decimal of even length that divides into two sequences in nines' complement form. For example 1/7 starts '142' and is followed by '857' while 6/7 (by rotation) starts '857' followed by its nines' complement '142'.

The rotation of the repetend of a cyclic number always happens in such a way that each successive repetend is a bigger number than the previous one. In the succession above, for instance, we see that 0.142857... < 0.285714... < 0.428571... < 0.571428... < 0.714285... < 0.857142.... This, for cyclic fractions with long repetends, allows us to easily predict what the result of multiplying the fraction by any natural number n will be, as long as the repetend is known.

A proper prime is a prime p which ends in the digit 1 in base 10 and whose reciprocal in base 10 has a repetend with length p − 1. In such primes, each digit 0, 1,..., 9 appears in the repeating sequence the same number of times as does each other digit (namely, (p − 1)/10 times). They are:

61, 131, 181, 461, 491, 541, 571, 701, 811, 821, 941, 971, 1021, 1051, 1091, 1171, 1181, 1291, 1301, 1349, 1381, 1531, 1571, 1621, 1741, 1811, 1829, 1861,... (sequence A073761 in the OEIS).

A prime is a proper prime if and only if it is a full reptend prime and congruent to 1 mod 10.

If a prime p is both full reptend prime and safe prime, then 1/p will produce a stream of p − 1 pseudo-random digits. Those primes are

7, 23, 47, 59, 167, 179, 263, 383, 503, 863, 887, 983, 1019, 1367, 1487, 1619, 1823, 2063... (sequence A000353 in the OEIS).

=== Other reciprocals of primes ===
Some reciprocals of primes that do not generate cyclic numbers are:

- 1/3 = 0.3̅, which has a period (repetend length) of 1.
- 1/11 = 0.0̅9̅, which has a period of two.
- 1/13 = 0.0̅7̅6̅9̅2̅3̅, which has a period of six.
- 1/31 = 0.0̅3̅2̅2̅5̅8̅0̅6̅4̅5̅1̅6̅1̅2̅9̅, which has a period of 15.
- 1/37 = 0.0̅2̅7̅, which has a period of three.
- 1/41 = 0.0̅2̅4̅3̅9̅, which has a period of five.
- 1/43 = 0.0̅2̅3̅2̅5̅5̅8̅1̅3̅9̅5̅3̅4̅8̅8̅3̅7̅2̅0̅9̅3̅, which has a period of 21.
- 1/53 = 0.0̅1̅8̅8̅6̅7̅9̅2̅4̅5̅2̅8̅3̅, which has a period of 13.
- 1/67 = 0.0̅1̅4̅9̅2̅5̅3̅7̅3̅1̅3̅4̅3̅2̅8̅3̅5̅8̅2̅0̅8̅9̅5̅5̅2̅2̅3̅8̅8̅0̅5̅9̅7̅, which has a period of 33.
- 1/71 = 0.0̅1̅4̅0̅8̅4̅5̅0̅7̅0̅4̅2̅2̅5̅3̅5̅2̅1̅1̅2̅6̅7̅6̅0̅5̅8̅3̅3̅8̅0̅2̅8̅1̅6̅9̅, which has a period of 35.
- 1/73 = 0.0̅1̅3̅6̅9̅8̅6̅3̅, which has a period of eight.
- 1/79 = 0.0̅1̅2̅6̅5̅8̅2̅2̅7̅8̅4̅8̅1̅, which has a period of 13.
- 1/83 = 0.0̅1̅2̅0̅4̅8̅1̅9̅2̅7̅7̅1̅0̅8̅4̅3̅3̅7̅3̅4̅9̅3̅9̅7̅5̅9̅0̅3̅6̅1̅4̅4̅5̅7̅8̅3̅1̅3̅2̅5̅3̅, which has a period of 41.
- 1/89 = 0.0̅1̅1̅2̅3̅5̅9̅5̅5̅0̅5̅6̅1̅7̅9̅7̅7̅5̅2̅8̅0̅8̅9̅8̅8̅7̅6̅4̅0̅4̅4̅9̅4̅3̅8̅2̅0̅2̅2̅4̅7̅1̅9̅1̅, which has a period of 44.

(sequence A006559 in the OEIS)

The reason is that 3 is a divisor of 9, 11 is a divisor of 99, 41 is a divisor of 99999, etc. To find the period of 1/p, we can check whether the prime p divides some number 999...999 in which the number of digits divides p − 1. Since the period is never greater than p − 1, we can obtain this by calculating (10^{p−1} − 1)/p. For example, for 11 we get

$$\frac{10^{11-1}-1}{11}= 909090909$$

and then by inspection find the repetend 09 and period of 2.

Those reciprocals of primes can be associated with several sequences of repeating decimals. For example, the multiples of 1/13 can be divided into two sets, with different repetends. The first set is:

- 1/13 = 0.0̅7̅6̅9̅2̅3̅
- 10/13 = 0.7̅6̅9̅2̅3̅0̅
- 9/13 = 0.6̅9̅2̅3̅0̅7̅
- 12/13 = 0.9̅2̅3̅0̅7̅6̅
- 3/13 = 0.2̅3̅0̅7̅6̅9̅
- 4/13 = 0.3̅0̅7̅6̅9̅2̅

where the repetend of each fraction is a cyclic re-arrangement of 076923. The second set is:

- 2/13 = 0.1̅5̅3̅8̅4̅6̅
- 7/13 = 0.5̅3̅8̅4̅6̅1̅
- 5/13 = 0.3̅8̅4̅6̅1̅5̅
- 11/13 = 0.8̅4̅6̅1̅5̅3̅
- 6/13 = 0.4̅6̅1̅5̅3̅8̅
- 8/13 = 0.6̅1̅5̅3̅8̅4̅

where the repetend of each fraction is a cyclic re-arrangement of 153846.

In general, the set of proper multiples of reciprocals of a prime p consists of n subsets, each with repetend length k, where nk = p − 1.

=== Totient rule ===
For an arbitrary integer n, the length L(n) of the decimal repetend of 1/n divides φ(n), where φ is the totient function. The length is equal to φ(n) if and only if 10 is a primitive root modulo n.

In particular, it follows that L(p) = p − 1 if and only if p is a prime and 10 is a primitive root modulo p. Then, the decimal expansions of n/p for n = 1, 2, ..., p − 1, all have period p − 1 and differ only by a cyclic permutation. Such numbers p are called full repetend primes.

== Reciprocals of composite integers coprime to 10 ==
If p is a prime other than 2 or 5, the decimal representation of the fraction 1/p^{2} repeats:

1/49 = 0.0̅2̅0̅4̅0̅8̅1̅6̅3̅2̅6̅5̅3̅0̅6̅1̅2̅2̅4̅4̅8̅9̅7̅9̅5̅9̅1̅8̅3̅6̅7̅3̅4̅6̅9̅3̅8̅7̅7̅5̅5̅1̅.

The period (repetend length) L(49) must be a factor of λ(49) = 42, where λ(n) is known as the Carmichael function. This follows from Carmichael's theorem which states that if n is a positive integer then λ(n) is the smallest integer m such that

$$a^m \equiv 1 \pmod n$$

for every integer a that is coprime to n.

The period of 1/p^{2} is usually pT_{p}, where T_{p} is the period of 1/p. There are three known primes for which this is not true, and for those the period of 1/p^{2} is the same as the period of 1/p because p^{2} divides 10^{p−1}−1. These three primes are 3, 487, and 56598313 (sequence A045616 in the OEIS).

Similarly, the period of 1/p^{k} is usually p^{k–1}T_{p}.

If p and q are primes other than 2 or 5, the decimal representation of the fraction 1/pq repeats. An example is 1/119:

119 = 7 × 17
λ(7 × 17) = LCM(λ(7), λ(17)) = LCM(6, 16) = 48,

where LCM denotes the least common multiple.

The period T of 1/pq is a factor of λ(pq) and it happens to be 48 in this case:

1/119 = 0.0̅0̅8̅4̅0̅3̅3̅6̅1̅3̅4̅4̅5̅3̅7̅8̅1̅5̅1̅2̅6̅0̅5̅0̅4̅2̅0̅1̅6̅8̅0̅6̅7̅2̅2̅6̅8̅9̅0̅7̅5̅6̅3̅0̅2̅5̅2̅1̅.

The period T of 1/pq is LCM(T_{p}, T_{q}), where T_{p} is the period of 1/p and T_{q} is the period of 1/q.

If p, q, r, etc. are primes other than 2 or 5, and k, ℓ, m, etc. are positive integers, then

$$\frac{1}{p^k q^\ell r^m \cdots}$$

is a repeating decimal with a period of

$$\operatorname{LCM}(T_{p^k}, T_{q^\ell}, T_{r^m}, \ldots)$$

where T_{p^{k}}, T_{q^{ℓ}}, T_{r^{m}},... are respectively the period of the repeating decimals 1/p^{k}, 1/q^{ℓ}, 1/r^{m},... as defined above.

== Reciprocals of integers not coprime to 10 ==
An integer that is not coprime to 10 but has a prime factor other than 2 or 5 has a reciprocal that is eventually periodic, but with a non-repeating sequence of digits that precede the repeating part. The reciprocal can be expressed as:

$$\frac{1}{2^a \cdot 5^b p^k q^\ell \cdots}\, ,$$

where a and b are not both zero.

This fraction can also be expressed as:

$$\frac{5^{a-b}}{10^a p^k q^\ell \cdots}\, ,$$

if a > b, or as

$$\frac{2^{b-a}}{10^b p^k q^\ell \cdots}\, ,$$

if b > a, or as

$$\frac{1}{10^a p^k q^\ell \cdots}\, ,$$

if a = b.

The decimal has:

- An initial transient of max(a, b) digits after the decimal point. Some or all of the digits in the transient can be zeros.
- A subsequent repetend which is the same as that for the fraction 1/(p^{k} q^{ℓ} ⋯).

For example 1/28 = 0.035̅7̅1̅4̅2̅8̅:

- a = 2, b = 0, and the other factors p^{k} q^{ℓ} ⋯ = 7
- there are 2 initial non-repeating digits, 03; and
- there are 6 repeating digits, 571428, the same amount as 1/7 has.

== Converting repeating decimals to fractions ==
Given a repeating decimal, it is possible to calculate the fraction that produces it. For example:

$x$	$= 0.333333\ldots$
$10x$	$= 3.333333\ldots$	(multiply each side of the above line by 10)
$9x$	$= 3$	(subtract the 1st line from the 2nd)
$x$	$= \frac39 = \frac13$	(reduce to lowest terms)

Another example:

$x$	$= \ \ \ \ 0.836363636\ldots$
$10x$	$= \ \ \ \ 8.36363636\ldots$	(move decimal to start of repetition = move by 1 place = multiply by 10)
$1000x$	$= 836.36363636\ldots$	(collate 2nd repetition here with 1st above = move by 2 places = multiply by 100)
$990x$	$= 828$	(subtract to clear decimals)
$x$	$= \frac{828}{990} = \frac{18 \cdot 46}{18 \cdot 55} = \frac{46}{55}$	(reduce to lowest terms)

=== A shortcut ===
The procedure below can be applied in particular if the repetend has n digits, all of which are 0 except the final one which is 1. For instance for n = 7:

$$\begin{align}
x &= 0.000000100000010000001\ldots \\
10^7x &= 1.000000100000010000001\ldots \\
\left(10^7-1\right)x=9999999x &= 1 \\
x &= \frac{1}{10^7-1} = \frac{1}{9999999}
\end{align}$$

So this particular repeating decimal corresponds to the fraction 1/(10^{n} − 1), where the denominator is the number written as n 9s. Knowing just that, a general repeating decimal can be expressed as a fraction without having to solve an equation. For example, one could reason:

$$\begin{align}
7.48181818\ldots & = 7.3 + 0.18181818\ldots \\[8pt]
& = \frac{73}{10}+\frac{18}{99} = \frac{73}{10} + \frac{9\cdot2}{9\cdot 11}
= \frac{73}{10} + \frac{2}{11} \\[12pt]
& = \frac{11\cdot73 + 10\cdot2}{10\cdot 11} = \frac{823}{110}
\end{align}$$

or

$$\begin{align}
11.18867924528301886792452830\ldots & = 11 + 0.18867924528301886792452830\ldots \\[8pt]
& = 11 + \frac{10}{53} = \frac{11\cdot53 + 10}{53} = \frac{593}{53}
\end{align}$$

It is possible to get a general formula expressing a repeating decimal with an n-digit period (repetend length), beginning right after the decimal point, as a fraction:

$$\begin{align}
x &= 0.\overline{a_1 a_2 \cdots a_n} \\
10^n x &= a_1 a_2 \cdots a_n.\overline{a_1 a_2 \cdots a_n} \\[5pt]
\left(10^n - 1\right)x = 99 \cdots 99x &= a_1 a_2 \cdots a_n \\[5pt]
x &= \frac{a_1 a_2 \cdots a_n}{10^n - 1} = \frac{a_1 a_2 \cdots a_n}{99 \cdots 99}
\end{align}$$

More explicitly, one gets the following cases:

If the repeating decimal is between 0 and 1, and the repeating block is n digits long, first occurring right after the decimal point, then the fraction (not necessarily reduced) will be the integer number represented by the n-digit block divided by the one represented by n 9s. For example,

- 0.444444... = 4/9 since the repeating block is 4 (a 1-digit block),
- 0.565656... = 56/99 since the repeating block is 56 (a 2-digit block),
- 0.012012... = 12/999 since the repeating block is 012 (a 3-digit block); this further reduces to 4/333.
- 0.999999... = 9/9 = 1, since the repeating block is 9 (also a 1-digit block)

If the repeating decimal is as above, except that there are k (extra) digits 0 between the decimal point and the repeating n-digit block, then one can simply add k digits 0 after the n digits 9 of the denominator (and, as before, the fraction may subsequently be simplified). For example,

- 0.000444... = 4/9000 since the repeating block is 4 and this block is preceded by 3 zeros,
- 0.005656... = 56/9900 since the repeating block is 56 and it is preceded by 2 zeros,
- 0.00012012... = 12/99900 = 1/8325 since the repeating block is 012 and it is preceded by 2 zeros.

Any repeating decimal not of the form described above can be written as a sum of a terminating decimal and a repeating decimal of one of the two above types (actually the first type suffices, but that could require the terminating decimal to be negative). For example,

- 1.23444... = 1.23 + 0.00444... = 123/100 + 4/900 = 1107/900 + 4/900 = 1111/900
  - or alternatively 1.23444... = 0.79 + 0.44444... = 79/100 + 4/9 = 711/900 + 400/900 = 1111/900
- 0.3789789... = 0.3 + 0.0789789... = 3/10 + 789/9990 = 2997/9990 + 789/9990 = 3786/9990 = 631/1665
  - or alternatively 0.3789789... = −0.6 + 0.9789789... = −6/10 + 978/999 = −5994/9990 + 9780/9990 = 3786/9990 = 631/1665

An even faster method is to ignore the decimal point completely and go like this

- 1.23444... = (1234 − 123)/900 = 1111/900 (denominator has one 9 and two 0s because one digit repeats and there are two non-repeating digits after the decimal point)
- 0.3789789... = (3789 − 3)/9990 = 3786/9990 (denominator has three 9s and one 0 because three digits repeat and there is one non-repeating digit after the decimal point)

It follows that any repeating decimal with period n, and k digits after the decimal point that do not belong to the repeating part, can be written as a (not necessarily reduced) fraction whose denominator is (10^{n} − 1)10^{k}.

Conversely the period of the repeating decimal of a fraction c/d will be (at most) the smallest number n such that 10^{n} − 1 is divisible by d.

For example, the fraction 2/7 has d = 7, and the smallest k that makes 10^{k} − 1 divisible by 7 is k = 6, because 999999 = 7 × 142857. The period of the fraction 2/7 is therefore 6.

==== In compressed form ====
The following picture suggests kind of compression of the above shortcut. Thereby $\mathbf{I}$ represents the digits of the integer part of the decimal number (to the left of the decimal point), $\mathbf{A}$ makes up the string of digits of the preperiod and $\#\mathbf{A}$ its length, and $\mathbf{P}$ being the string of repeated digits (the period) with length $\#\mathbf{P}$ which is nonzero.

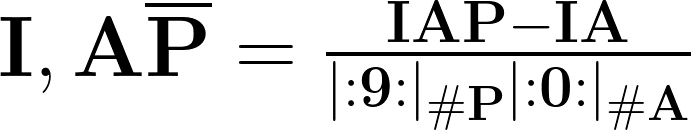
Formation rule

In the generated fraction, the digit $9$ will be repeated $\#\mathbf{P}$ times, and the digit $0$ will be repeated $\#\mathbf{A}$ times.

Note that in the absence of an integer part in the decimal, $\mathbf{I}$ will be represented by zero, which being to the left of the other digits, will not affect the final result, and may be omitted in the calculation of the generating function.

Examples:

$$\begin{array}{lllll}
3.254444\ldots &=3.25\overline{4} &= \begin{Bmatrix}
\mathbf{I}=3&\mathbf{A}=25&\mathbf{P}=4\\
&\#\mathbf{A}=2&\#\mathbf{P}=1
\end{Bmatrix}
&=\dfrac{3254-325}{900}&=\dfrac{2929}{900}
\\
\\0.512512\ldots &=0.\overline{512} &= \begin{Bmatrix}
\mathbf{I}=0&\mathbf{A}=\emptyset&\mathbf{P}=512\\
&\#\mathbf{A}=0&\#\mathbf{P}=3
\end{Bmatrix}
&=\dfrac{512-0}{999}&=\dfrac{512}{999}
\\
\\1.09191\ldots &=1.0\overline{91} &= \begin{Bmatrix}
\mathbf{I}=1&\mathbf{A}=0&\mathbf{P}=91\\
&\#\mathbf{A}=1&\#\mathbf{P}=2
\end{Bmatrix}
&=\dfrac{1091-10}{990}&=\dfrac{1081}{990}
\\
\\1.333\ldots &=1.\overline{3} &= \begin{Bmatrix}
\mathbf{I}=1&\mathbf{A}=\emptyset&\mathbf{P}=3\\
&\#\mathbf{A}=0&\#\mathbf{P}=1
\end{Bmatrix}
&=\dfrac{13-1}{9}&=\dfrac{12}{9}&=\dfrac{4}{3}
\\
\\0.3789789\ldots &=0.3\overline{789} &= \begin{Bmatrix}
\mathbf{I}=0&\mathbf{A}=3&\mathbf{P}=789\\
&\#\mathbf{A}=1&\#\mathbf{P}=3
\end{Bmatrix}
&=\dfrac{3789-3}{9990}&=\dfrac{3786}{9990}&=\dfrac{631}{1665}
\end{array}$$

The symbol $\emptyset$ in the examples above denotes the absence of digits of part $\mathbf{A}$ in the decimal, and therefore $\#\mathbf{A}=0$ and a corresponding absence in the generated fraction.

== Repeating decimals as infinite series ==
A repeating decimal can also be expressed as an infinite series. That is, a repeating decimal can be regarded as the sum of an infinite number of rational numbers. To take the simplest example,

$$0.\overline{1} = \frac{1}{10} + \frac{1}{100} + \frac{1}{1000} + \cdots = \sum_{n=1}^\infty \frac{1}{10^n}$$

The above series is a geometric series with the first term as 1/10 and the common factor 1/10. Because the absolute value of the common factor is less than 1, we can say that the geometric series converges and find the exact value in the form of a fraction by using the following formula where a is the first term of the series and r is the common factor.

$$\frac{a}{1-r} = \frac{\frac{1}{10}}{1-\frac{1}{10}} = \frac{1}{10-1} = \frac{1}{9}$$

Similarly,

$$\begin{align}
0.\overline{142857} &= \frac{142857}{10^6} + \frac{142857}{10^{12}} + \frac{142857}{10^{18}} + \cdots = \sum_{n=1}^\infty \frac{142857}{10^{6n}} \\[6px]
\implies &\quad \frac{a}{1-r} = \frac{\frac{142857}{10^6}}{1-\frac{1}{10^6}} = \frac{142857}{10^6-1} = \frac{142857}{999999} = \frac17
\end{align}$$

== Multiplication and cyclic permutation ==
The cyclic behavior of repeating decimals in multiplication also leads to the construction of integers which are cyclically permuted when multiplied by certain numbers. For example, 102564 × 4 = 410256. 102564 is the repetend of 4/39 and 410256 the repetend of 16/39.

== Other properties of repetend lengths ==
Various properties of repetend lengths (periods) are given by Mitchell and Dickson.

- The period of 1/k for integer k is always ≤ k − 1.
- If p is prime, the period of 1/p divides evenly into p − 1.
- If k is composite, the period of 1/k is strictly less than k − 1.
- The period of c/k, for c coprime to k, equals the period of 1/k.
- If k = 2^{a}·5^{b}n where n > 1 and n is not divisible by 2 or 5, then the length of the transient of 1/k is max(a, b), and the period equals r, where r is the multiplicative order of 10 mod n, that is the smallest integer such that 10^{r} ≡ 1 (mod n).
- If p, p′, p″,... are distinct primes, then the period of 1/(p p′ p″ ⋯) equals the lowest common multiple of the periods of 1/p, 1/p′, 1/p″,....
- If k and k′ have no common prime factors other than 2 or 5, then the period of 1/(k k′) equals the least common multiple of the periods of 1/k and 1/k′.
- For prime p, if

$$\text{period}\left(\frac{1}{p}\right)= \text{period}\left(\frac{1}{p^2}\right)= \cdots = \text{period}\left(\frac{1}{p^m}\right)$$

for some m, but

$$\text{period}\left(\frac{1}{p^m}\right) \ne \text{period}\left(\frac {1}{p^{m+1}}\right),$$

then for c ≥ 0 we have

$$\text{period}\left(\frac{1}{p^{m+c}}\right) = p^c \cdot \text{period}\left(\frac{1}{p}\right).$$

- If p is a proper prime ending in a 1, that is, if the repetend of 1/p is a cyclic number of length p − 1 and p = 10h + 1 for some h, then each digit 0, 1, ..., 9 appears in the repetend exactly h = (p − 1)/10 times.

For some other properties of repetends, see also.

== Extension to other bases ==
Various features of repeating decimals extend to the representation of numbers in all other integer bases, not just base 10:

- Every real number can be represented as an integer part followed by a radix point (the generalization of a decimal point to non-decimal systems) followed by a finite or infinite number of digits.
- If the base is an integer, a terminating sequence obviously represents a rational number.
- A rational number has a terminating sequence if all the prime factors of the denominator of the fully reduced fractional form are also factors of the base. These numbers make up a dense set in Q and R.
- If the positional numeral system is a standard one, that is it has base

$$b\in\Z\smallsetminus\{-1,0,1\}$$

combined with a consecutive set of digits

$$D:=\{d_1, d_1+1, \dots, d_r\}$$

with r := |b|, d_{r} := d_{1} + r − 1 and 0 ∈ D, then a terminating sequence is obviously equivalent to the same sequence with non-terminating repeating part consisting of the digit 0. If the base is positive, then there exists an order homomorphism from the lexicographical order of the right-sided infinite strings over the alphabet D into some closed interval of the reals, which maps the strings 0.A_{1}A_{2}...A_{n}d̅_{b̅} and 0.A_{1}A_{2}...(A_{n}+1)d̅_{1̅} with A_{i} ∈ D and A_{n} ≠ d_{b} to the same real number – and there are no other duplicate images. In the decimal system, for example, there is 0.9̅ = 1.0̅ = 1; in the balanced ternary system there is 0.1̅ = 1.T̅ = 1/2.

- A rational number has an indefinitely repeating sequence of finite length l, if the reduced fraction's denominator contains a prime factor that is not a factor of the base. If q is the maximal factor of the reduced denominator which is coprime to the base, l is the smallest exponent such that q divides b^{ℓ} − 1. It is the multiplicative order ord_{q}(b) of the residue class b mod q which is a divisor of the Carmichael function λ(q) which in turn is smaller than q. The repeating sequence is preceded by a transient of finite length if the reduced fraction also shares a prime factor with the base. A repeating sequence

$$\left(0.\overline{A_1A_2\ldots A_\ell}\right)_b$$

represents the fraction

$$\frac{( A_1A_2\ldots A_\ell)_b}{b^\ell-1}.$$

- An irrational number has a representation of infinite length that is not, from any point, an indefinitely repeating sequence of finite length.

For example, in duodecimal, 1/2 = 0.6, 1/3 = 0.4, 1/4 = 0.3 and 1/6 = 0.2 all terminate; 1/5 = 0.2̅4̅9̅7̅ repeats with period length 4, in contrast with the equivalent decimal expansion of 0.2; 1/7 = 0.1̅8̅6̅A̅3̅5̅ has period 6 in duodecimal, just as it does in decimal.

If b is an integer base and k is an integer, then

$$\frac{1}{k} = \frac{1}{b} + \frac{(b-k)^1}{b^2} + \frac{(b-k)^2}{b^3} + \frac{(b-k)^3}{b^4} + \cdots + \frac{(b-k)^{N-1}}{b^N} + \cdots = \frac1b \frac1{1-\frac{b-k}b}.$$

For example 1/7 in duodecimal:
$$\frac17 = \left(\frac1{10^{\phantom1}} + \frac5{10^2} + \frac{21}{10^3} + \frac{A5}{10^4} + \frac{441}{10^5} + \frac{1985}{10^6} + \cdots \right)_\text{base 12}$$

which is 0.1̅8̅6̅A̅3̅5̅_{base12}. 10_{base12} is 12_{base10}, 10^{2}_{base12} is 144_{base10}, 21_{base12} is 25_{base10}, A5_{base12} is 125_{base10}.

=== Algorithm for positive bases ===
For a rational 0 < p/q < 1 (and base b ∈ N_{>1}) there is the following algorithm producing the repetend together with its length:

function b_adic(b,p,q) // b ≥ 2; 0 < p < q
  digits = "0123..."; // up to the digit with value b–1
begin
  s = "";  // the string of digits
  pos = 0; // all places are right to the radix point
  while not defined(occurs[p]) do
    occurs[p] = pos; // the position of the place with remainder p
    bp = b*p;
    z = floor(bp/q); // index z of digit within: 0 ≤ z ≤ b-1
    p = b*p − z*q;   // 0 ≤ p < q
    if p = 0 then L = 0;
      if not z = 0 then
        s = s . substring(digits, z, 1) 
      end if
      return (s);
    end if
    s = s . substring(digits, z, 1); // append the character of the digit
    pos += 1;
  end while
  L = pos - occurs[p]; // the length of the repetend (being < q)
  // mark the digits of the repetend by a vinculum:
  for i from occurs[p] to pos-1 do
    substring(s, i, 1) = overline(substring(s, i, 1));
  end for
  return (s);
end function

The first highlighted line calculates the digit z.

The subsequent line calculates the new remainder p′ of the division modulo the denominator q. As a consequence of the floor function floor we have

$$\frac{b p}{q} - 1 \; \; < \; \; z = \left\lfloor \frac{b p}{q} \right\rfloor \; \; \le \; \; \frac{b p}{q} ,$$

thus

$$b p - q < z q \quad \implies \quad p' := b p - z q < q$$

and

$$z q \le b p\quad \implies \quad 0 \le b p - z q =: p' \,.$$

Because all these remainders p are non-negative integers less than q, there can be only a finite number of them with the consequence that they must recur in the while loop. Such a recurrence is detected by the associative array occurs. The new digit z is formed in the yellow line, where p is the only non-constant. The length L of the repetend equals the number of the remainders (see also section Every rational number is either a terminating or repeating decimal).

== See also ==
- Decimal representation
- Full reptend prime
- Midy's theorem
- Parasitic number
- Trailing zero
- Unique prime
- 0.999..., a repeating decimal equal to one
- Pigeonhole principle
