= Totative =

Coprime number less than a given integer

In number theory, a totative of a given positive integer n is an integer k such that 0 < k ≤ n and k is coprime to n. Euler's totient function φ(n) counts the number of totatives of n. The totatives under multiplication modulo n form the multiplicative group of integers modulo n.

== Distribution ==
The distribution of totatives has been a subject of study. Paul Erdős conjectured that, writing the totatives of n as

$$0 < a_1 < a_2 \cdots < a_{\phi(n)} < n ,$$

the mean square gap satisfies

$$\sum_{i=1}^{\phi(n)-1} (a_{i+1}-a_i)^2 < C n^2 / \phi(n)$$

for some constant C, and this was proven by Bob Vaughan and Hugh Montgomery.

== See also ==
- Reduced residue system
