= Artin's conjecture on primitive roots =

Conjecture in number theory

In number theory, Artin's conjecture on primitive roots states that a given integer a that is neither a square number nor −1 is a primitive root modulo infinitely many primes p. The conjecture also ascribes an asymptotic density to these primes. This conjectural density equals Artin's constant or a rational multiple thereof.

The conjecture was made by Emil Artin to Helmut Hasse on September 27, 1927, according to the latter's diary. The conjecture is still unresolved as of 2026. It is proven that there cannot be more than two primes for which Artin's conjecture fails.

In October 2026, OpenAI released a catalogue of manuscripts produced by an internal model, including a paper (029) claiming an unconditional proof of the existence part of Artin's conjecture on primitive roots, establishing a density lower bound of $c_a x / (\log x)^2$ that is lower than the conjectured density. The result had not been reviewed by the mathematical community.

In a preprint posted on 14 October 2026, Manjul Bhargava derived a positive lower relative density among the primes for each admissible integer base, improving the lower bound to order $x/\log x$. The argument uses OpenAI's marked Type II estimates and a zero-free result of Cureton and Thorner, and gives a lower bound rather than the exact conjectural density.

In November 2026, Vlado Vojdanovski posted a preprint claiming an unconditional extension to simultaneous primitive roots for arbitrary nonempty finite sets of integer bases excluding $0,1,-1$. It states that the primes for which every base is a primitive root have positive lower relative density whenever neither of Matthews' two obstructions occurs, and form a finite set otherwise. The accompanying Lean formalization covers the simultaneous theorem, including the single-base existence assertion of Artin's conjecture, and incorporates formalizations of the OpenAI results used in the proof.

== Formulation ==
Let a be an integer that is not a square number and not −1. Write a = a_{0}b^{2} with a_{0} square-free. Denote by S(a) the set of prime numbers p such that a is a primitive root modulo p. Then the conjecture states

1. S(a) has a positive asymptotic density inside the set of primes. In particular, S(a) is infinite.
2. Under the conditions that a is not a perfect power and a_{0} is not congruent to 1 modulo 4 (sequence A085397 in the OEIS), this density is independent of a and equals Artin's constant, which can be expressed as an infinite product
  $C_{\mathrm{Artin}}=\prod_{p\ \mathrm{prime}} \left(1-\frac{1}{p^2-p}\right) = 0.3739558136\ldots$ (sequence A005596 in the OEIS).

The positive integers satisfying these conditions are:

2, 3, 6, 7, 10, 11, 12, 14, 15, 18, 19, 22, 23, 24, 26, 28, 30, 31, 34, 35, 38, 39, 40, 42, 43, 44, 46, 47, 48, 50, 51, 54, 55, 56, 58, 59, 60, 62, 63, … (sequence A085397 in the OEIS)

The negative integers satisfying these conditions are:

2, 4, 5, 6, 9, 10, 13, 14, 16, 17, 18, 20, 21, 22, 24, 25, 26, 29, 30, 33, 34, 36, 37, 38, 40, 41, 42, 45, 46, 49, 50, 52, 53, 54, 56, 57, 58, 61, 62, … (sequence A120629 in the OEIS)

Similar conjectural product formulas exist for the density when a does not satisfy the above conditions. In these cases, the conjectural density is always a rational multiple of C_{Artin}.

If a is either square number or −1, then this density is 0.

If a is not a perfect power but a_{0} is congruent to 1 modulo 4, then this density is $C_\text{Artin}\left(1-\prod_{p|a_0, p\ \text{prime}}\frac{1}{-p^2+p+1}\right)$.

If a is a perfect power, let r be the largest number such that a is an rth power, then this density is:

$C_\text{Artin}\prod_{p|r, p\ \text{prime}}\frac{p^2-2p}{p^2-p-1}$ if a_{0} is not congruent to 1 modulo 4;

$C_\text{Artin}\prod_{p|r, p\ \text{prime}}\frac{p^2-2p}{p^2-p-1}\left(1-\prod_{p|a_0, p\ \text{prime}}\frac{1}{-p^2+p+1}\prod_{p|\gcd(a_0,r), p\ \text{prime}}\frac{p^2-p-1}{p-2}\right)$ if a_{0} is congruent to 1 modulo 4.

For $n=1,2,3,\cdots$, the conjectural densities given by the formula are C_{Artin} times

0, 1, 1, 0, 20/19, 1, 1, 3/5, 0, 1, 1, 1, 156/155, 1, 1, 0, 272/271, 1, 1, 20/19, 204/205, 1, 1, 1, 0, 1, 3/5, 1, 812/811, 1, 1, 15/19, 544/545, 1, 1, 0, 1332/1331, 1, 1, 1, 1640/1639, 1, 1, 1, 20/19, 1, 1, 1, 0, 1, ... (OEIS: A399880 for the numerators, OEIS: A399881 for the denominators)

For $n=-1,-2,-3,\cdots$, the conjectural densities given by the formula are C_{Artin} times

0, 1, 6/5, 1, 1, 1, 42/41, 3/5, 1, 1, 110/109, 6/5, 1, 1, 94/95, 1, 1, 1, 342/341, 1, 1, 1, 506/505, 1, 1, 1, 6/5, 42/41, 1, 1, 930/929, 15/19, 1, 1, 778/779, 1, 1, 1, 774/775, 1, 1, 1, 1806/1805, 110/109, 1, 1, 2162/2161, 6/5, 1, 1, ... (OEIS: A399882 for the numerators, OEIS: A399883 for the denominators)

== Examples ==
For example, take a = 2. The conjecture is that the set of primes p for which 2 is a primitive root has the density C_{Artin}. The set of such primes is (sequence A001122 in the OEIS)

S(2) = {3, 5, 11, 13, 19, 29, 37, 53, 59, 61, 67, 83, 101, 107, 131, 139, 149, 163, 173, 179, 181, 197, 211, 227, 269, 293, 317, 347, 349, 373, 379, 389, 419, 421, 443, 461, 467, 491, ...}.

It has 38 elements smaller than 500 and there are 95 primes smaller than 500. The ratio (which conjecturally tends to C_{Artin}) is 38/95 = 2/5 = 0.4.

For a = 4 = 2^{2}, which is a square number, the density is 0, and for a = 8 = 2^{3}, which is a power of 2, the conjectured density is $\frac{3}{5}C$, and for a = 5, which is congruent to 1 mod 4, the conjectured density is $\frac{20}{19}C$.

== Partial results ==
In 1967, Christopher Hooley published a conditional proof for the conjecture, assuming certain cases of the extended Riemann hypothesis.

D. R. Heath-Brown proved in 1986 that at least one of 2, 3, or 5 is a primitive root modulo infinitely many primes p. He also proved (Corollary 2) that there are at most two primes for which Artin's conjecture fails, (Corollary 3) that there are at most three square-free integers for which Artin's conjecture fails, and (Corollary 4) that there is a constant $c>0$ such that among all integers of magnitude up to x at most $c(\ln(x))^2$ fail Artin's conjecture.

If p is a prime of the form $p=4q+1$ with q itself a prime, then $a=2$ is known to be a primitive root modulo p. Proving that there are infinitely many p of this type would establish $a=2$ as an explicit a for which Artin's conjecture is known to hold.

In October 2026, OpenAI released a catalogue of manuscripts produced by an internal model, including a paper (029) claiming an unconditional proof of the existence part of Artin's conjecture on primitive roots, establishing a density lower bound of $c_a x / (\log x)^2$ that is lower than the conjectured density. The manuscript dump had several related results, including a claimed proof of a quasi-Riemann hypothesis (003). Prior proofs of Artin's conjecture were conditional to the generalized Riemann hypothesis, but the OpenAI proof of Artin's conjecture on primitive roots used the machinery developed for the quasi-Riemann hypothesis to provide what it claimed was an unconditional proof. Neither proof had been reviewed by the mathematical community at the time of release.

== Abelian varieties ==
Unconditionally, the infinite part of Artin's primitive root conjecture for general abelian varieties was proved in:

C. Virdol, Artin's conjecture for abelian varieties, Kyoto Journal of Mathematics, 2016.

Moreover, unconditionally, the strong form of Artin's primitive root conjecture for general CM elliptic curves was proved in:

C. Virdol, On Artin's conjecture for CM elliptic curves, Kyoto Journal of Mathematics, 2020.

Conditionally, under the Generalized Riemann Hypothesis, Gupta and Murty proved Artin's primitive root conjecture for elliptic curves with complex multiplication, for primes splitting in the relevant imaginary quadratic field.

== See also ==
- Stephens' constant, a number that plays the same role in a generalization of Artin's conjecture as Artin's constant plays here
- Brown–Zassenhaus conjecture
- Full reptend prime
- Cyclic number
