= Stephens's constant =

Mathematical constant

In number theory, Stephens' constant expresses the density of certain subsets of the prime numbers. Let $a$ and $b$ be two multiplicatively independent integers, that is, $a^m b^n \neq 1$ except when both $m$ and $n$ equal zero. Consider the set $T(a,b)$ of prime numbers $p$ such that $p$ evenly divides $a^k - b$ for some power $k$. Assuming the generalized Riemann hypothesis, the density of the set $T(a,b)$ relative to the set of all primes is a rational multiple of

$C_S = \prod_p \bigg(1 - \frac{p}{p^3-1} \bigg) = 0.57595996889294543964316337549249669\ldots$(sequence A065478 in the OEIS)

Stephens' constant is closely related to the Artin constant $C_A$ that arises in the study of primitive roots:

$$C_S= \prod_{p} \bigg( C_A + \frac{1-p^2}{p^2(p-1)}\bigg) \bigg(\frac{p}{p+1+1/p}\bigg).$$

== See also ==
- Euler product
- Twin prime constant
