= Reduced residue system =

Set of residue classes modulo n, relatively prime to n

In mathematics, a subset R of the integers is called a reduced residue system modulo n if:

1. gcd(r, n) = 1 for each r in R,
2. R contains φ(n) elements,
3. no two elements of R are congruent modulo n.

Here φ denotes Euler's totient function.

A reduced residue system modulo n can be formed from a complete residue system modulo n by removing all integers not relatively prime to n. For example, a complete residue system modulo 12 is {0, 1, 2, 3, 4, 5, 6, 7, 8, 9, 10, 11}. The totatives 1, 5, 7 and 11 are the only integers in this set which are relatively prime to 12, and so the corresponding reduced residue system modulo 12 is {1, 5, 7, 11}. The cardinality of this set can be calculated with the totient function: φ(12) = 4. Some other reduced residue systems modulo 12 are:

- {13, 17, 19, 23}
- {−11, −7, −5, −1}
- {−7, −13, 13, 31}
- {35, 43, 53, 61}

== Facts ==
- Every number in a reduced residue system modulo n is a generator for the additive group of integers modulo n.
- A reduced residue system modulo n is a group under multiplication modulo n.
- If {r_{1}, r_{2}, ... , r_{φ(n)}} is a reduced residue system modulo n with n > 2, then ∑_{i} r_{i} ≡ 0 (mod n).
- If {r_{1}, r_{2}, ... , r_{φ(n)}} is a reduced residue system modulo n, and a is an integer such that gcd(a, n) = 1, then {ar_{1}, ar_{2}, ... , ar_{φ(n)}} is also a reduced residue system modulo n.

== See also ==
- Multiplicative group of integers modulo n
- Congruence relation
- Euler's totient function
- Greatest common divisor
- Modular arithmetic
- Number theory
- Residue number system
