= Multiplicative order =

Concept in modular arithmetic

In number theory, given a positive integer n and an integer a coprime to n, the multiplicative order of a modulo n is the smallest positive integer k such that a^{k} ≡ 1 (mod n).

In other words, the multiplicative order of a modulo n is the order of a in the multiplicative group of the units in the ring of the integers modulo n.

The order of a modulo n is sometimes written as ord_{n}(a).

== Example ==
The powers of 4 modulo 7 are as follows:

$$\begin{array}{llll}
4^0 &= 1 &=0 \times 7 + 1 &\equiv 1\pmod7 \\
4^1 &= 4 &=0 \times 7 + 4 &\equiv 4\pmod7 \\
4^2 &= 16 &=2 \times 7 + 2 &\equiv 2\pmod7 \\
4^3 &= 64 &=9 \times 7 + 1 &\equiv 1\pmod7 \\
4^4 &= 256 &=36 \times 7 + 4 &\equiv 4\pmod7 \\
4^5 &= 1024 &=146 \times 7 + 2 &\equiv 2\pmod7 \\
\vdots\end{array}$$

The smallest positive integer k such that 4^{k} ≡ 1 (mod 7) is 3, so the order of 4 (mod 7) is 3. Note that $a^0 = 1 \equiv 1 \pmod n$ is trivially true for any non-zero $a$, but since zero is not a positive integer, trivial solutions are not valid.

== Properties ==
Even without knowledge that we are working in the multiplicative group of integers modulo n, we can show that a actually has an order by noting that the powers of a can only take a finite number of different values modulo n, so according to the pigeonhole principle there must be two powers, say s and t and without loss of generality s > t, such that a^{s} ≡ a^{t} (mod n). Since a and n are coprime, a has an inverse element a^{−1} and we can multiply both sides of the congruence with a^{−t}, yielding a^{s−t} ≡ 1 (mod n).

The concept of multiplicative order is a special case of the order of group elements. The multiplicative order of a number a modulo n is the order of a in the multiplicative group whose elements are the residues modulo n of the numbers coprime to n, and whose group operation is multiplication modulo n. This is the group of units of the ring Z_{n}; it has φ(n) elements, φ being Euler's totient function, and is denoted as U(n) or U(Z_{n}).

As a consequence of Lagrange's theorem, the order of a (mod n) always divides φ(n). If the order of a is actually equal to φ(n), and therefore as large as possible, then a is called a primitive root modulo n. This means that the group U(n) is cyclic and the residue class of a generates it.

The order of a (mod n) also divides λ(n), a value of the Carmichael function, which is an even stronger statement than the divisibility of φ(n).

== Programming languages ==
- Maxima CAS: zn_order(a, n)
- Wolfram Language: MultiplicativeOrder[k, n]
- Rosetta Code – examples of multiplicative order in various languages

== See also ==
- Discrete logarithm
- Modular arithmetic
