= Multiplicative group of integers modulo n =

Group of units of the ring of integers modulo n

In modular arithmetic, the integers coprime (relatively prime) to n from the set $\{0,1,\dots,n-1\}$ of n non-negative integers form a group under multiplication modulo n, called the multiplicative group of integers modulo n. Equivalently, the elements of this group can be thought of as the congruence classes, also known as residues modulo n, that are coprime to n. Hence another name is the group of primitive residue classes modulo n. In the theory of rings, a branch of abstract algebra, it is described as the group of units of the ring of integers modulo n. Here units refers to elements with a multiplicative inverse, which, in this ring, are exactly those coprime to n.

This group, usually denoted $(\mathbb{Z}/n\mathbb{Z})^\times$, is fundamental in number theory. It is used in cryptography, integer factorization, and primality testing. It is an abelian, finite group whose order is given by Euler's totient function: $|(\mathbb{Z}/n\mathbb{Z})^\times|=\varphi(n).$ For prime n the group is cyclic, and in general the structure is easy to describe, but no simple general formula for finding generators is known.

== Group axioms ==
It is a straightforward exercise to show that, under multiplication, the set of congruence classes modulo n that are coprime to n satisfy the axioms for an abelian group.

Indeed, a is coprime to n if and only if gcd(a, n) = 1. Integers in the same congruence class a ≡ b (mod n) satisfy gcd(a, n) = gcd(b, n); hence one is coprime to n if and only if the other is. Thus the notion of congruence classes modulo n that are coprime to n is well-defined.

Since gcd(a, n) = 1 and gcd(b, n) = 1 implies gcd(ab, n) = 1, the set of classes coprime to n is closed under multiplication.

Integer multiplication respects the congruence classes; that is, a ≡ a' and b ≡ b' (mod n) implies ab ≡ a'b' (mod n). This implies that the multiplication is associative, commutative, and that the class of 1 is the unique multiplicative identity.

Finally, given a, the multiplicative inverse of a modulo n is an integer x satisfying ax ≡ 1 (mod n). It exists precisely when a is coprime to n, because in that case gcd(a, n) = 1 and by Bézout's lemma there are integers x and y satisfying ax + ny = 1. Notice that the equation ax + ny = 1 implies that x is coprime to n, so the multiplicative inverse belongs to the group. An example for calculating x can be found in the article Modular multiplicative inverse.

== Notation ==
The set of (congruence classes of) integers modulo n with the operations of addition and multiplication is a ring. It is denoted $\mathbb{Z}/n\mathbb{Z}$ or $\mathbb{Z}/(n)$ (the notation refers to taking the quotient of integers modulo the ideal $n\mathbb{Z}$ or $(n)$ consisting of the multiples of n). Outside of number theory the simpler notation $\mathbb{Z}_n$ is often used, though it can be confused with the p-adic integers when n is a prime number.

The multiplicative group of integers modulo n, which is the group of units in this ring, may be written as (depending on the author) $(\mathbb{Z}/n\mathbb{Z})^\times,$ $(\mathbb{Z}/n\mathbb{Z})^*,$ $\mathrm{U}(\mathbb{Z}/n\mathbb{Z}),$ $\mathrm{E}(\mathbb{Z}/n\mathbb{Z})$ (for German Einheit, which translates as unit), $\mathbb{Z}_n^*$, or similar notations. This article uses $(\mathbb{Z}/n\mathbb{Z})^\times.$

The notation $\mathrm{C}_n$ refers to the cyclic group of order n. It is isomorphic to the group of integers modulo n under addition. Note that $\mathbb{Z}/n\mathbb{Z}$ or $\mathbb{Z}_n$ may also refer to the group under addition. For example, the multiplicative group $(\mathbb{Z}/p\mathbb{Z})^\times$ for a prime p is cyclic and hence isomorphic to the additive group $\mathbb{Z}/(p-1)\mathbb{Z}$, but the isomorphism is not obvious.

== Structure ==
The order of the multiplicative group of integers modulo n is the number of integers in $\{0,1,\dots,n-1\}$ coprime to n. It is given by Euler's totient function: $| (\mathbb{Z}/n\mathbb{Z})^\times|=\varphi(n)$ (sequence A000010 in the OEIS). For prime p, $\varphi(p)=p-1$.

=== Cyclic case ===
The group $(\mathbb{Z}/n\mathbb{Z})^\times$ is cyclic if and only if n is 1, 2, 4, p^{k} or 2p^{k}, where p is an odd prime and k > 0. For all other values of n the group is not cyclic. This was first proved by Gauss.

This means that for these n:

$(\mathbb{Z}/n\mathbb{Z})^\times \cong \mathrm{C}_{\varphi(n)},$ where $\varphi(p^k)=\varphi(2 p^k)=p^k - p^{k-1}.$

By definition, the group is cyclic if and only if it has a generator g; that is, the powers $g^0,g^1,g^2,\dots,$ give all possible residues modulo n coprime to n (the first $\varphi(n)$ powers $g^0,\dots,g^{\varphi(n)-1}$ give each exactly once). A generator of $(\mathbb{Z}/n\mathbb{Z})^\times$ is called a primitive root modulo n. If there is any generator, then there are $\varphi(\varphi(n))$ of them.

=== Powers of 2 ===
Modulo 1 any two integers are congruent, i.e., there is only one congruence class, [0], coprime to 1. Therefore, $(\mathbb{Z}/1\,\mathbb{Z})^\times \cong \mathrm{C}_1$ is the trivial group with φ(1) = 1 element. Because of its trivial nature, the case of congruences modulo 1 is generally ignored and some authors choose not to include the case of n = 1 in theorem statements.

Modulo 2 there is only one coprime congruence class, [1], so $(\mathbb{Z}/2\mathbb{Z})^\times \cong \mathrm{C}_1$ is the trivial group.

Modulo 4 there are two coprime congruence classes, [1] and [3], so $(\mathbb{Z}/4\mathbb{Z})^\times \cong \mathrm{C}_2,$ the cyclic group with two elements.

Modulo 8 there are four coprime congruence classes, [1], [3], [5] and [7]. The square of each of these is 1, so $(\mathbb{Z}/8\mathbb{Z})^\times \cong \mathrm{C}_2 \times \mathrm{C}_2,$ the Klein four-group.

Modulo 16 there are eight coprime congruence classes [1], [3], [5], [7], [9], [11], [13] and [15]. $\{\pm 1, \pm 7\}\cong \mathrm{C}_2 \times \mathrm{C}_2,$ is the 2-torsion subgroup (i.e., the square of each element is 1), so $(\mathbb{Z}/16\mathbb{Z})^\times$ is not cyclic. The powers of 3, $\{1, 3, 9, 11\}$ are a subgroup of order 4, as are the powers of 5, $\{1, 5, 9, 13\}.$ Thus $(\mathbb{Z}/16\mathbb{Z})^\times \cong \mathrm{C}_2 \times \mathrm{C}_4.$

The pattern shown by 8 and 16 holds for higher powers 2^{k}, k > 2: $\{\pm 1, 2^{k-1} \pm 1\}\cong \mathrm{C}_2 \times \mathrm{C}_2,$ is the 2-torsion subgroup, so $(\mathbb{Z}/2^k\mathbb{Z})^\times$ cannot be cyclic, and the powers of 3 are a cyclic subgroup of order 2^{k − 2}, so:

$(\mathbb{Z}/2^k\mathbb{Z})^\times \cong \mathrm{C}_2 \times \mathrm{C}_{2^{k-2}}.$

=== General composite numbers ===
By the fundamental theorem of finite abelian groups, the group $(\mathbb{Z}/n\mathbb{Z})^\times$ is isomorphic to a direct product of cyclic groups of prime power orders.

More specifically, the Chinese remainder theorem says that if $\;\;n=p_1^{k_1}p_2^{k_2}p_3^{k_3}\dots, \;$ then the ring $\mathbb{Z}/n\mathbb{Z}$ is the direct product of the rings corresponding to each of its prime power factors:

$$\mathbb{Z}/n\mathbb{Z} \cong \mathbb{Z}/{p_1^{k_1}}\mathbb{Z}\; \times \;\mathbb{Z}/{p_2^{k_2}}\mathbb{Z} \;\times\; \mathbb{Z}/{p_3^{k_3}}\mathbb{Z}\dots\;\;$$

Similarly, the group of units $(\mathbb{Z}/n\mathbb{Z})^\times$ is the direct product of the groups corresponding to each of the prime power factors:

$$(\mathbb{Z}/n\mathbb{Z})^\times\cong (\mathbb{Z}/{p_1^{k_1}}\mathbb{Z})^\times \times (\mathbb{Z}/{p_2^{k_2}}\mathbb{Z})^\times  \times (\mathbb{Z}/{p_3^{k_3}}\mathbb{Z})^\times \dots\;.$$

For each odd prime power $p^{k}$ the corresponding factor $(\mathbb{Z}/{p^{k}}\mathbb{Z})^\times$ is the cyclic group of order $\varphi(p^k)=p^k - p^{k-1}$, which may further factor into cyclic groups of prime-power orders. For powers of 2 the factor $(\mathbb{Z}/{2^{k}}\mathbb{Z})^\times$ is not cyclic unless k = 0, 1, 2, but factors into cyclic groups as described above.

The order of the group $\varphi(n)$ is the product of the orders of the cyclic groups in the direct product. The exponent of the group; that is, the least common multiple of the orders in the cyclic groups, is given by the Carmichael function $\lambda(n)$ (sequence A002322 in the OEIS). In other words, $\lambda(n)$ is the smallest number such that for each a coprime to n, $a^{\lambda(n)} \equiv 1 \pmod n$ holds. It divides $\varphi(n)$ and is equal to it if and only if the group is cyclic.

== Subgroup of false witnesses ==
If n is composite, there exists a possibly proper subgroup of $\mathbb{Z}_n^\times$, called the "group of false witnesses", comprising the solutions of the equation $x^{n-1}=1$, the elements which, raised to the power n − 1, are congruent to 1 modulo n. Fermat's Little Theorem states that for n = p a prime, this group consists of all $x\in \mathbb{Z}_p^\times$; thus for n composite, such residues x are "false positives" or "false witnesses" for the primality of n. The number x = 2 is most often used in this basic primality check, and n = 341 = 11 × 31 is notable since $2^{341-1}\equiv 1 \mod 341$, and n = 341 is the smallest composite number for which x = 2 is a false witness to primality. In fact, the false witnesses subgroup for 341 contains 100 elements, and is of index 3 inside the 300-element group $\mathbb{Z}_{341}^\times$.

=== Examples ===
==== n = 9 ====
The smallest example with a nontrivial subgroup of false witnesses is 9 = 3 × 3. There are 6 residues coprime to 9: 1, 2, 4, 5, 7, 8. Since 8 is congruent to −1 modulo 9, it follows that 8^{8} is congruent to 1 modulo 9. So 1 and 8 are false positives for the "primality" of 9 (since 9 is not actually prime). These are in fact the only ones, so the subgroup {1,8} is the subgroup of false witnesses. The same argument shows that n − 1 is a "false witness" for any odd composite n.

==== n = 91 ====
For n = 91 (= 7 × 13), there are $\varphi(91)=72$ residues coprime to 91, half of them (i.e., 36 of them) are false witnesses of 91, namely 1, 3, 4, 9, 10, 12, 16, 17, 22, 23, 25, 27, 29, 30, 36, 38, 40, 43, 48, 51, 53, 55, 61, 62, 64, 66, 68, 69, 74, 75, 79, 81, 82, 87, 88, and 90, since for these values of x, x^{90} is congruent to 1 mod 91.

==== n = 561 ====
n = 561 (= 3 × 11 × 17) is a Carmichael number, thus s^{560} is congruent to 1 modulo 561 for any integer s coprime to 561. The subgroup of false witnesses is, in this case, not proper; it is the entire group of multiplicative units modulo 561, which consists of 320 residues.

== Examples ==
This table shows the cyclic decomposition of $(\mathbb{Z}/n\mathbb{Z})^\times$ and a generating set for n ≤ 128. The decomposition and generating sets are not unique; for example,

$$\displaystyle \begin{align}(\mathbb{Z}/35\mathbb{Z})^\times & \cong (\mathbb{Z}/5\mathbb{Z})^\times \times (\mathbb{Z}/7\mathbb{Z})^\times  \cong \mathrm{C}_4 \times \mathrm{C}_6 \cong \mathrm{C}_4 \times \mathrm{C}_2 \times \mathrm{C}_3 \cong \mathrm{C}_2 \times \mathrm{C}_{12} \cong (\mathbb{Z}/4\mathbb{Z})^\times \times (\mathbb{Z}/13\mathbb{Z})^\times  \\ & \cong (\mathbb{Z}/52\mathbb{Z})^\times \end{align}$$

(but $\not\cong \mathrm{C}_{24} \cong \mathrm{C}_8 \times \mathrm{C}_3$). The table below lists the shortest decomposition (among those, the lexicographically first is chosen – this guarantees isomorphic groups are listed with the same decompositions). The generating set is also chosen to be as short as possible, and for n with primitive root, the smallest primitive root modulo n is listed.

For example, take $(\mathbb{Z}/20\mathbb{Z})^\times$. Then $\varphi(20)=8$ means that the order of the group is 8 (i.e., there are 8 numbers less than 20 and coprime to it); $\lambda(20)=4$ means the order of each element divides 4; that is, the fourth power of any number coprime to 20 is congruent to 1 (mod 20). The set {3,19} generates the group, which means that every element of $(\mathbb{Z}/20\mathbb{Z})^\times$ is of the form 3^{a} × 19^{b} (where a is 0, 1, 2, or 3, because the element 3 has order 4, and similarly b is 0 or 1, because the element 19 has order 2).

Smallest primitive root mod n are (0 if no root exists)

0, 1, 2, 3, 2, 5, 3, 0, 2, 3, 2, 0, 2, 3, 0, 0, 3, 5, 2, 0, 0, 7, 5, 0, 2, 7, 2, 0, 2, 0, 3, 0, 0, 3, 0, 0, 2, 3, 0, 0, 6, 0, 3, 0, 0, 5, 5, 0, 3, 3, 0, 0, 2, 5, 0, 0, 0, 3, 2, 0, 2, 3, 0, 0, 0, 0, 2, 0, 0, 0, 7, 0, 5, 5, 0, 0, 0, 0, 3, 0, 2, 7, 2, 0, 0, 3, 0, 0, 3, 0, ... (sequence A046145 in the OEIS)

Numbers of the elements in a minimal generating set of mod n are

1, 1, 1, 1, 1, 1, 1, 2, 1, 1, 1, 2, 1, 1, 2, 2, 1, 1, 1, 2, 2, 1, 1, 3, 1, 1, 1, 2, 1, 2, 1, 2, 2, 1, 2, 2, 1, 1, 2, 3, 1, 2, 1, 2, 2, 1, 1, 3, 1, 1, 2, 2, 1, 1, 2, 3, 2, 1, 1, 3, 1, 1, 2, 2, 2, 2, 1, 2, 2, 2, 1, 3, 1, 1, 2, 2, 2, 2, 1, 3, 1, 1, 1, 3, 2, 1, 2, 3, 1, 2, ... (sequence A046072 in the OEIS)

Group structure of $(\mathbb{Z}/n\mathbb{Z})^\times$
$n\;$	$(\mathbb{Z}/n\mathbb{Z})^\times$	$\varphi(n)$	$\lambda(n)\;$	Generating set	$n\;$	$(\mathbb{Z}/n\mathbb{Z})^\times$	$\varphi(n)$	$\lambda(n)\;$	Generating set	$n\;$	$(\mathbb{Z}/n\mathbb{Z})^\times$	$\varphi(n)$	$\lambda(n)\;$	Generating set	$n\;$	$(\mathbb{Z}/n\mathbb{Z})^\times$	$\varphi(n)$	$\lambda(n)\;$	Generating set
1	C_{1}	1	1	0	33	C_{2}×C_{10}	20	10	2, 10	65	C_{4}×C_{12}	48	12	2, 12	97	C_{96}	96	96	5
2	C_{1}	1	1	1	34	C_{16}	16	16	3	66	C_{2}×C_{10}	20	10	5, 7	98	C_{42}	42	42	3
3	C_{2}	2	2	2	35	C_{2}×C_{12}	24	12	2, 6	67	C_{66}	66	66	2	99	C_{2}×C_{30}	60	30	2, 5
4	C_{2}	2	2	3	36	C_{2}×C_{6}	12	6	5, 19	68	C_{2}×C_{16}	32	16	3, 67	100	C_{2}×C_{20}	40	20	3, 99
5	C_{4}	4	4	2	37	C_{36}	36	36	2	69	C_{2}×C_{22}	44	22	2, 68	101	C_{100}	100	100	2
6	C_{2}	2	2	5	38	C_{18}	18	18	3	70	C_{2}×C_{12}	24	12	3, 69	102	C_{2}×C_{16}	32	16	5, 101
7	C_{6}	6	6	3	39	C_{2}×C_{12}	24	12	2, 38	71	C_{70}	70	70	7	103	C_{102}	102	102	5
8	C_{2}×C_{2}	4	2	3, 5	40	C_{2}×C_{2}×C_{4}	16	4	3, 11, 39	72	C_{2}×C_{2}×C_{6}	24	6	5, 17, 19	104	C_{2}×C_{2}×C_{12}	48	12	3, 5, 103
9	C_{6}	6	6	2	41	C_{40}	40	40	6	73	C_{72}	72	72	5	105	C_{2}×C_{2}×C_{12}	48	12	2, 29, 41
10	C_{4}	4	4	3	42	C_{2}×C_{6}	12	6	5, 13	74	C_{36}	36	36	5	106	C_{52}	52	52	3
11	C_{10}	10	10	2	43	C_{42}	42	42	3	75	C_{2}×C_{20}	40	20	2, 74	107	C_{106}	106	106	2
12	C_{2}×C_{2}	4	2	5, 7	44	C_{2}×C_{10}	20	10	3, 43	76	C_{2}×C_{18}	36	18	3, 37	108	C_{2}×C_{18}	36	18	5, 107
13	C_{12}	12	12	2	45	C_{2}×C_{12}	24	12	2, 44	77	C_{2}×C_{30}	60	30	2, 76	109	C_{108}	108	108	6
14	C_{6}	6	6	3	46	C_{22}	22	22	5	78	C_{2}×C_{12}	24	12	5, 7	110	C_{2}×C_{20}	40	20	3, 109
15	C_{2}×C_{4}	8	4	2, 14	47	C_{46}	46	46	5	79	C_{78}	78	78	3	111	C_{2}×C_{36}	72	36	2, 110
16	C_{2}×C_{4}	8	4	3, 15	48	C_{2}×C_{2}×C_{4}	16	4	5, 7, 47	80	C_{2}×C_{4}×C_{4}	32	4	3, 7, 79	112	C_{2}×C_{2}×C_{12}	48	12	3, 5, 111
17	C_{16}	16	16	3	49	C_{42}	42	42	3	81	C_{54}	54	54	2	113	C_{112}	112	112	3
18	C_{6}	6	6	5	50	C_{20}	20	20	3	82	C_{40}	40	40	7	114	C_{2}×C_{18}	36	18	5, 37
19	C_{18}	18	18	2	51	C_{2}×C_{16}	32	16	5, 50	83	C_{82}	82	82	2	115	C_{2}×C_{44}	88	44	2, 114
20	C_{2}×C_{4}	8	4	3, 19	52	C_{2}×C_{12}	24	12	7, 51	84	C_{2}×C_{2}×C_{6}	24	6	5, 11, 13	116	C_{2}×C_{28}	56	28	3, 115
21	C_{2}×C_{6}	12	6	2, 20	53	C_{52}	52	52	2	85	C_{4}×C_{16}	64	16	2, 3	117	C_{6}×C_{12}	72	12	2, 17
22	C_{10}	10	10	7	54	C_{18}	18	18	5	86	C_{42}	42	42	3	118	C_{58}	58	58	11
23	C_{22}	22	22	5	55	C_{2}×C_{20}	40	20	2, 21	87	C_{2}×C_{28}	56	28	2, 86	119	C_{2}×C_{48}	96	48	3, 118
24	C_{2}×C_{2}×C_{2}	8	2	5, 7, 13	56	C_{2}×C_{2}×C_{6}	24	6	3, 13, 29	88	C_{2}×C_{2}×C_{10}	40	10	3, 5, 7	120	C_{2}×C_{2}×C_{2}×C_{4}	32	4	7, 11, 19, 29
25	C_{20}	20	20	2	57	C_{2}×C_{18}	36	18	2, 20	89	C_{88}	88	88	3	121	C_{110}	110	110	2
26	C_{12}	12	12	7	58	C_{28}	28	28	3	90	C_{2}×C_{12}	24	12	7, 11	122	C_{60}	60	60	7
27	C_{18}	18	18	2	59	C_{58}	58	58	2	91	C_{6}×C_{12}	72	12	2, 3	123	C_{2}×C_{40}	80	40	7, 83
28	C_{2}×C_{6}	12	6	3, 13	60	C_{2}×C_{2}×C_{4}	16	4	7, 11, 19	92	C_{2}×C_{22}	44	22	3, 91	124	C_{2}×C_{30}	60	30	3, 61
29	C_{28}	28	28	2	61	C_{60}	60	60	2	93	C_{2}×C_{30}	60	30	11, 61	125	C_{100}	100	100	2
30	C_{2}×C_{4}	8	4	7, 11	62	C_{30}	30	30	3	94	C_{46}	46	46	5	126	C_{6}×C_{6}	36	6	5, 13
31	C_{30}	30	30	3	63	C_{6}×C_{6}	36	6	2, 5	95	C_{2}×C_{36}	72	36	2, 94	127	C_{126}	126	126	3
32	C_{2}×C_{8}	16	8	3, 31	64	C_{2}×C_{16}	32	16	3, 63	96	C_{2}×C_{2}×C_{8}	32	8	5, 17, 31	128	C_{2}×C_{32}	64	32	3, 127

== See also ==
- Lenstra elliptic curve factorization
- List of small abelian groups

== Notes ==
k	2	3	4	5	6	7	8	9
OEIS	A272592	A272593	A272594	A272595	A272596	A272597	A272598	A272599
