= Carmichael function =

Function in mathematical number theory

In number theory, a branch of mathematics, the Carmichael function λ(n) of a positive integer n is the smallest positive integer m such that
$$a^m \equiv 1 \pmod{n}$$
holds for every integer a coprime to n. In algebraic terms, λ(n) is the exponent of the multiplicative group of integers modulo n. As this is a finite abelian group, there must exist an element whose order equals the exponent, λ(n). Such an element is called a primitive λ-root modulo n.

Carmichael λ function: λ(n) for 1 ≤ n ≤ 1000 (compared to Euler φ function)

The Carmichael function is named after the American mathematician Robert Carmichael who defined it in 1910. It is also known as Carmichael's λ function, the reduced totient function, and the least universal exponent function.

The order of the multiplicative group of integers modulo n is φ(n), where φ is Euler's totient function. Since the order of an element of a finite group divides the order of the group, λ(n) divides φ(n). The following table compares the first 36 values of λ(n) (sequence A002322 in the OEIS) and φ(n) (in bold if they are different; the values of n such that they are different are listed in (sequence A033949 in the OEIS)).

n	1	2	3	4	5	6	7	8	9	10	11	12	13	14	15	16	17	18	19	20	21	22	23	24	25	26	27	28	29	30	31	32	33	34	35	36
λ(n)	1	1	2	2	4	2	6	**2**	6	4	10	**2**	12	6	**4**	**4**	16	6	18	**4**	**6**	10	22	**2**	20	12	18	**6**	28	**4**	30	**8**	**10**	16	**12**	**6**
φ(n)	1	1	2	2	4	2	6	**4**	6	4	10	**4**	12	6	**8**	**8**	16	6	18	**8**	**12**	10	22	**8**	20	12	18	**12**	28	**8**	30	**16**	**20**	16	**24**	**12**

== Numerical examples ==
- n = 5. The set of numbers less than and coprime to 5 is {1,2,3,4}. Hence Euler's totient function has value φ(5) = 4 and the value of Carmichael's function, λ(5), must be a divisor of 4. The divisor 1 does not satisfy the definition of Carmichael's function since $a^1 \not\equiv 1\pmod{5}$ except for $a\equiv1\pmod{5}$. Neither does 2 since $2^2 \equiv 3^2 \equiv 4 \not\equiv 1\pmod{5}$. Hence λ(5) = 4. Indeed, $1^4\equiv 2^4\equiv 3^4\equiv 4^4\equiv1\pmod{5}$. Both 2 and 3 are primitive λ-roots modulo 5 and also primitive roots modulo 5.
- n = 8. The set of numbers less than and coprime to 8 is {1,3,5,7} . Hence φ(8) = 4 and λ(8) must be a divisor of 4. In fact λ(8) = 2 since $1^2\equiv 3^2\equiv 5^2\equiv 7^2\equiv1\pmod{8}$. The primitive λ-roots modulo 8 are 3, 5, and 7. There are no primitive roots modulo 8.

== Recurrence for λ(n) ==
The Carmichael lambda function of a prime power can be expressed in terms of the Euler totient. Any number that is not 1 or a prime power can be written uniquely as the product of distinct prime powers, in which case λ of the product is the least common multiple of the λ of the prime power factors. Specifically, λ(n) is given by the recurrence
$$\lambda(n) = \begin{cases}
\varphi(n) & \text{if }n\text{ is 1, 2, 4, or a power of an odd prime,}\\
\tfrac12\varphi(n) & \text{if }n=2^r,\ r\ge3,\\
\operatorname{lcm}\Bigl(\lambda(n_1),\lambda(n_2),\ldots,\lambda(n_k)\Bigr) & \text{if }n=n_1n_2\ldots n_k\text{ where }n_1,n_2,\ldots,n_k\text{ are powers of distinct primes.}
\end{cases}$$
Euler's totient for a prime power, that is, a number p^{r} with p prime and r ≥ 1, is given by
$$\varphi(p^r) = p^{r-1}(p-1).$$

== Carmichael's theorems ==
Carmichael proved two theorems that, together, establish that if λ(n) is considered as defined by the recurrence of the previous section, then it satisfies the property stated in the introduction, namely that it is the smallest positive integer m such that $a^m\equiv 1\pmod{n}$ for all a relatively prime to n.

Theorem 1—If a is relatively prime to n then $a^{\lambda(n)}\equiv 1\pmod{n}$.

This implies that the order of every element of the multiplicative group of integers modulo n divides λ(n). Carmichael calls an element a for which $a^{\lambda(n)}$ is the least power of a congruent to 1 (mod n) a primitive λ-root modulo n. (This is not to be confused with a primitive root modulo n, which Carmichael sometimes refers to as a primitive $\varphi$-root modulo n.)

Theorem 2—For every positive integer n there exists a primitive λ-root modulo n. Moreover, if g is such a root, then there are $\varphi(\lambda(n))$ primitive λ-roots that are congruent to powers of g.

If g is one of the primitive λ-roots guaranteed by the theorem, then $g^m\equiv1\pmod{n}$ has no positive integer solutions m less than λ(n), showing that there is no positive m < λ(n) such that $a^m\equiv 1\pmod{n}$ for all a relatively prime to n.

The second statement of Theorem 2 does not imply that all primitive λ-roots modulo n are congruent to powers of a single root g. For example, if n = 15, then λ(n) = 4 while $\varphi(n)=8$ and $\varphi(\lambda(n))=2$. There are four primitive λ-roots modulo 15, namely 2, 7, 8, and 13 as $1\equiv2^4\equiv8^4\equiv7^4\equiv13^4$. The roots 2 and 8 are congruent to powers of each other and the roots 7 and 13 are congruent to powers of each other, but neither 7 nor 13 is congruent to a power of 2 or 8 and vice versa. The other four elements of the multiplicative group modulo 15, namely 1, 4 (which satisfies $4\equiv2^2\equiv8^2\equiv7^2\equiv13^2$), 11, and 14, are not primitive λ-roots modulo 15.

For a contrasting example, if n = 9, then $\lambda(n)=\varphi(n)=6$ and $\varphi(\lambda(n))=2$. There are two primitive λ-roots modulo 9, namely 2 and 5, each of which is congruent to the fifth power of the other. They are also both primitive $\varphi$-roots modulo 9.

The numbers of primitive λ-roots modulo n for $n=1,2,3,\cdots$ are

1, 1, 1, 1, 2, 1, 2, 3, 2, 2, 4, 3, 4, 2, 4, 4, 8, 2, 6, 4, 6, 4, 10, 7, 8, 4, 6, 6, 12, 4, 8, 8, 12, 8, 8, 6, 12, 6, 8, 8, 16, 6, 12, 12, 8, 10, 22, 8, 12, 8, ... (sequence A111725 in the OEIS)

== Properties of the Carmichael function ==
In this section, an integer $n$ is divisible by a nonzero integer $m$ if there exists an integer $k$ such that $n = km$. This is written as
$$m \mid n.$$

=== A consequence of minimality of λ(n) ===
Suppose a^{m} ≡ 1 (mod n) for all numbers a coprime with n. Then λ(n) | m.

Proof: If m = kλ(n) + r with 0 ≤ r < λ(n), then
$$a^r = 1^k \cdot a^r \equiv \left(a^{\lambda(n)}\right)^k\cdot a^r = a^{k\lambda(n)+r} = a^m \equiv 1\pmod{n}$$
for all numbers a coprime with n. It follows that r = 0 since r < λ(n) and λ(n) is the minimal positive exponent for which the congruence holds for all a coprime with n.

=== λ(n) divides φ(n) ===
This follows from elementary group theory, because the exponent of any finite group must divide the order of the group. λ(n) is the exponent of the multiplicative group of integers modulo n while φ(n) is the order of that group. In particular, the two must be equal in the cases where the multiplicative group is cyclic due to the existence of a primitive root, which is the case for odd prime powers.

We can thus view Carmichael's theorem as a sharpening of Euler's theorem.

=== Divisibility ===
$$a\,|\,b \Rightarrow \lambda(a)\,|\,\lambda(b)$$

Proof.

By definition, for any integer $k$ with $\gcd(k,b) = 1$ (and thus also $\gcd(k,a) = 1$), we have that $b \,|\, (k^{\lambda(b)} - 1)$ , and therefore $a \,|\, (k^{\lambda(b)} - 1)$. This establishes that $k^{\lambda(b)}\equiv1\pmod{a}$ for all k relatively prime to a. By the consequence of minimality proved above, we have $\lambda(a)\,|\,\lambda(b)$.

=== Composition ===
For all positive integers a and b it holds that
$$\lambda(\mathrm{lcm}(a,b)) = \mathrm{lcm}(\lambda(a), \lambda(b)).$$
This is an immediate consequence of the recurrence for the Carmichael function.

=== Exponential cycle length ===
If $r_{\mathrm{max}}=\max_i\{r_i\}$ is the biggest exponent in the prime factorization $n= p_1^{r_1}p_2^{r_2} \cdots p_{k}^{r_k}$ of n, then for all a (including those not coprime to n) and all r ≥ r_{max},
$$a^r \equiv a^{\lambda(n)+r} \pmod n.$$

In particular, for square-free n ( r_{max} = 1), for all a we have
$$a \equiv a^{\lambda(n)+1} \pmod n.$$

=== Average value ===
For any n ≥ 16:
$$\frac{1}{n} \sum_{i \leq n} \lambda (i)  =  \frac{n}{\ln n} e^{B (1+o(1)) \ln\ln n / (\ln\ln\ln n)  }$$
(called Erdős approximation in the following) with the constant
$$B := e^{-\gamma} \prod_{p\in\mathbb P} \left({1 - \frac{1}{(p-1)^2(p+1)}}\right) \approx 0.34537$$
and γ ≈ 0.57721, the Euler–Mascheroni constant.

The following table gives some overview over the first 2^{26} – 1 = 67108863 values of the λ function, for both, the exact average and its Erdős-approximation.

Additionally given is some overview over the more easily accessible “logarithm over logarithm” values LoL(n) := (ln λ(n))/(ln n) with

- LoL(n) > 4/5 ⇔ λ(n) > n^{4/5}.

There, the table entry in row number 26 at column

- % LoL > 4/5 → 60.49

indicates that 60.49% (≈ 40000000) of the integers 1 ≤ n ≤ 67108863 have λ(n) > n^{4/5} meaning that the majority of the λ values is exponential in the length l := log_{2}(n) of the input n, namely
$$\left(2^\frac45\right)^l = 2^\frac{4l}{5} = \left(2^l\right)^\frac45 = n^\frac45.$$

ν	n = 2^{ν} – 1	sum $\sum_{i\le n} \lambda(i)$	average $\tfrac1n \sum_{i\le n} \lambda(i)$	Erdős average	Erdős / exact average	LoL average	% LoL > 4/5	% LoL > 7/8
5	31	270	8.709677	68.643	7.8813	0.678244	41.94	35.48
6	63	964	15.301587	61.414	4.0136	0.699891	38.10	30.16
7	127	3574	28.141732	86.605	3.0774	0.717291	38.58	27.56
8	255	12994	50.956863	138.190	2.7119	0.730331	38.82	23.53
9	511	48032	93.996086	233.149	2.4804	0.740498	40.90	25.05
10	1023	178816	174.795699	406.145	2.3235	0.748482	41.45	26.98
11	2047	662952	323.865169	722.526	2.2309	0.754886	42.84	27.70
12	4095	2490948	608.290110	1304.810	2.1450	0.761027	43.74	28.11
13	8191	9382764	1145.496765	2383.263	2.0806	0.766571	44.33	28.60
14	16383	35504586	2167.160227	4392.129	2.0267	0.771695	46.10	29.52
15	32767	134736824	4111.967040	8153.054	1.9828	0.776437	47.21	29.15
16	65535	513758796	7839.456718	15225.43	1.9422	0.781064	49.13	28.17
17	131071	1964413592	14987.40066	28576.97	1.9067	0.785401	50.43	29.55
18	262143	7529218208	28721.79768	53869.76	1.8756	0.789561	51.17	30.67
19	524287	28935644342	55190.46694	101930.9	1.8469	0.793536	52.62	31.45
20	1048575	111393101150	106232.8409	193507.1	1.8215	0.797351	53.74	31.83
21	2097151	429685077652	204889.9090	368427.6	1.7982	0.801018	54.97	32.18
22	4194303	1660388309120	395867.5158	703289.4	1.7766	0.804543	56.24	33.65
23	8388607	6425917227352	766029.1187	1345633	1.7566	0.807936	57.19	34.32
24	16777215	24906872655990	1484565.386	2580070	1.7379	0.811204	58.49	34.43
25	33554431	96666595865430	2880889.140	4956372	1.7204	0.814351	59.52	35.76
26	67108863	375619048086576	5597160.066	9537863	1.7041	0.817384	60.49	36.73

=== Prevailing interval ===
For all numbers N and all but o(N) positive integers n ≤ N (a "prevailing" majority):
$$\lambda(n) = \frac{n} {(\ln n)^{\ln\ln\ln n + A  + o(1)}}$$
with the constant
$$A := -1 + \sum_{p\in\mathbb P} \frac{\ln p}{(p-1)^2} \approx 0.2269688$$

=== Lower bounds ===
For any sufficiently large number N and for any Δ ≥ (ln ln N)^{3}, there are at most
$$N\exp\left(-0.69(\Delta\ln\Delta)^\frac13\right)$$
positive integers n ≤ N such that λ(n) ≤ ne^{−Δ}.

=== Minimal order ===
For any sequence n_{1} < n_{2} < n_{3} < ⋯ of positive integers, any constant 0 < c < 1/(ln 2), and any sufficiently large i:
$$\lambda(n_i) > \left(\ln n_i\right)^{c\ln\ln\ln n_i}.$$

=== Small values ===
For a constant c and any sufficiently large positive A, there exists an integer n > A such that
$$\lambda(n)<\left(\ln A\right)^{c\ln\ln\ln A}.$$
Moreover, n is of the form
$$n=\mathop{\prod_{q \in \mathbb P}}_{(q-1)|m}q$$
for some square-free integer m < (ln A)^{c ln ln ln A}.

=== Image of the function ===
The set of values of the Carmichael function has counting function
$$\frac{x}{(\ln x)^{\eta+o(1)}} ,$$
where
$$\eta=1-\frac{1+\ln\ln2}{\ln2} \approx 0.08607$$

== Use in cryptography ==
The Carmichael function is important in cryptography due to its use in the RSA encryption algorithm.

== Proof of Theorem 1 ==
For n = p, a prime, Theorem 1 is equivalent to Fermat's little theorem:
$$a^{p-1}\equiv1\pmod{p}\qquad\text{for all }a\text{ coprime to }p.$$
For prime powers p^{r}, r > 1, if
$$a^{p^{r-1}(p-1)}=1+hp^r$$
holds for some integer h, then raising both sides to the power p gives
$$a^{p^r(p-1)}=1+h'p^{r+1}$$
for some other integer $h'$. By induction it follows that $a^{\varphi(p^r)}\equiv1\pmod{p^r}$ for all a relatively prime to p and hence to p^{r}. This establishes the theorem for n = 4 or any odd prime power.

=== Sharpening the result for higher powers of two ===
For a coprime to (powers of) 2 we have a = 1 + 2h_{2} for some integer h_{2}. Then,
$$a^2 = 1+4h_2(h_2+1) = 1+8\binom{h_2+1}{2}=:1+8h_3,$$
where $h_3$ is an integer. With r = 3, this is written
$$a^{2^{r-2}} = 1+2^r h_r.$$
Squaring both sides gives
$$a^{2^{r-1}}=\left(1+2^r h_r\right)^2=1+2^{r+1}\left(h_r+2^{r-1}h_r^2\right)=:1+2^{r+1}h_{r+1},$$
where $h_{r+1}$ is an integer. It follows by induction that
$$a^{2^{r-2}}=a^{\frac{1}{2}\varphi(2^r)}\equiv 1\pmod{2^r}$$
for all $r\ge3$ and all a coprime to $2^r$.

=== Integers with multiple prime factors ===
By the unique factorization theorem, any n > 1 can be written in a unique way as
$$n= p_1^{r_1}p_2^{r_2} \cdots p_{k}^{r_k}$$
where p_{1} < p_{2} < ... < p_{k} are primes and r_{1}, r_{2}, ..., r_{k} are positive integers. The results for prime powers establish that, for $1\le j\le k$,
$$a^{\lambda\left(p_j^{r_j}\right)}\equiv1 \pmod{p_j^{r_j}}\qquad\text{for all }a\text{ coprime to }n\text{ and hence to }p_i^{r_i}.$$
From this it follows that
$$a^{\lambda(n)}\equiv1 \pmod{p_j^{r_j}}\qquad\text{for all }a\text{ coprime to }n,$$
where, as given by the recurrence,
$$\lambda(n) = \operatorname{lcm}\Bigl(\lambda\left(p_1^{r_1}\right),\lambda\left(p_2^{r_2}\right),\ldots,\lambda\left(p_k^{r_k}\right)\Bigr).$$
From the Chinese remainder theorem one concludes that
$$a^{\lambda(n)}\equiv1 \pmod{n}\qquad\text{for all }a\text{ coprime to }n.$$

== See also ==
- Carmichael number
