= Anatoly Karatsuba =

Russian mathematician (1937–2008)

Anatoly Alexeyevich Karatsuba
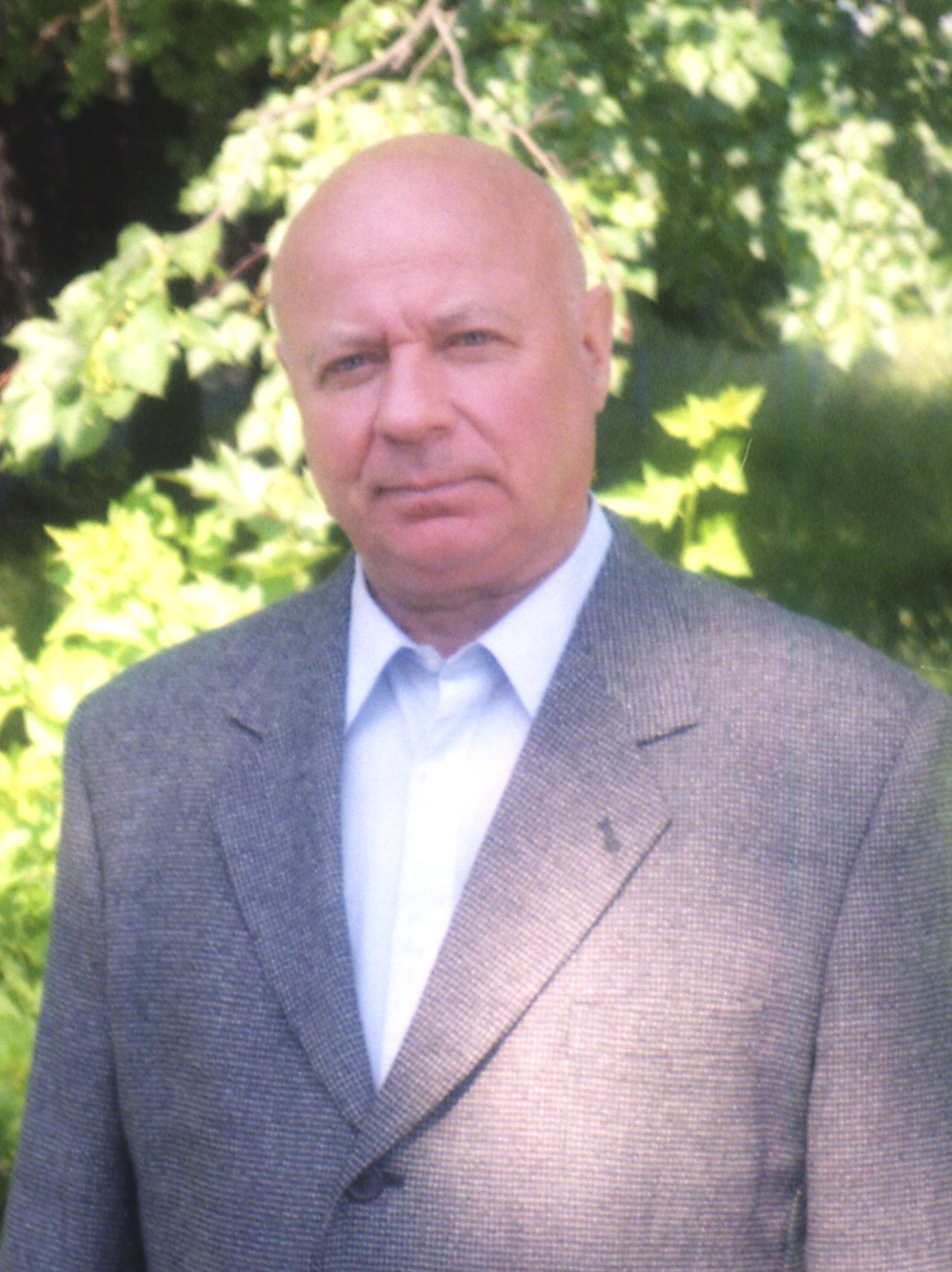
- Born: 31 January 1937; Grozny, Soviet Union
- Died: 28 September 2008 (aged 71); Moscow, Russia
- Education: Moscow State University
- Scientific career
- Fields: Mathematician
- Doctoral advisor: N. M. Korobov

Anatoly Alexeyevich Karatsuba (his first name often spelled Anatolii) (Russian: Анато́лий Алексе́евич Карацу́ба; Grozny, Soviet Union, 31 January 1937 – Moscow, Russia, 28 September 2008) was a Russian mathematician working in the field of analytic number theory, p-adic numbers and Dirichlet series.

For most of his student and professional life he was associated with the Faculty of Mechanics and Mathematics of Moscow State University, defending a D.Sc. there entitled "The method of trigonometric sums and intermediate value theorems" in 1966. He later held a position at the Steklov Institute of Mathematics of the Academy of Sciences.

His textbook Foundations of Analytic Number Theory went to two editions, 1975 and 1983.

The Karatsuba algorithm is the earliest known divide and conquer algorithm for multiplication and lives on as a special case of its direct generalization, the Toom–Cook algorithm.

The main research works of Anatoly Karatsuba were published in more than 160 research papers and monographs.

His daughter, Yekaterina Karatsuba, also a mathematician, constructed the FEE method.

== Work on informatics ==
As a student of Lomonosov Moscow State University, Karatsuba attended the seminar of Andrey Kolmogorov and found solutions to two problems set up by Kolmogorov. This was essential for the development of automata theory and started a new branch in Mathematics, the theory of fast algorithms.

=== Automata ===
In the paper of Edward F. Moore, $(n; m; p)$, an automaton (or a machine) $S$, is defined as a device with $n$ states, $m$ input symbols and $p$ output symbols. Nine theorems on the structure of $S$ and experiments with $S$ are proved. Later such $S$ machines got the name of Moore machines. At the end of the paper, in the chapter «New problems», Moore formulates the problem of improving the estimates which he obtained in Theorems 8 and 9:

Theorem 8 (Moore)
Given an arbitrary $(n; m; p)$ machine $S$, such that every two states can be distinguished from each other, there exists an experiment of length $n(n-1)/2$ that identifies the state of $S$ at the end of this experiment.

In 1957 Karatsuba proved two theorems which completely solved the Moore problem on improving the estimate of the length of experiment in his Theorem 8.

Theorem A (Karatsuba)
If $S$ is a $(n; m; p)$ machine such that each two its states can be distinguished from each other then there exists a ramified experiment of length at most $(n-1)(n-2)/2 + 1$, by means of which one can find the state $S$ at the end of the experiment.
Theorem B (Karatsuba)
There exists a $(n; m; p)$ machine, every states of which can be distinguished from each other, such that the length of the shortest experiment finding the state of the machine at the end of the experiment, is equal to $(n-1)(n-2)/2 + 1$.

These two theorems were proved by Karatsuba in his 4th year as a basis of his 4th year project; the corresponding paper was submitted to the journal "Uspekhi Mat. Nauk" on December 17, 1958 and published in June 1960. Up to this day (2011) this result of Karatsuba that later acquired the title "the Moore-Karatsuba theorem", remains the only precise (the only precise non-linear order of the estimate) non-linear result both in the automata theory and in the similar problems of the theory of complexity of computations.

== Work on number theory ==
The main research works of A. A. Karatsuba were published in more than 160 research papers and monographs.

=== The p-adic method ===
A.A.Karatsuba constructed a new $p$-adic method in the theory of trigonometric sums. The estimates of so-called $L$-sums of the form

$$S = \sum_{x=1}^P e^{2\pi i (a_1x/p^n+ \cdots + a_nx^n/p)}, \quad (a_s,p) = 1, \quad 1 \le s \le n,$$

led to the new bounds for zeros of the Dirichlet $L$-series modulo a power of a prime number, to the asymptotic formula for the number of Waring congruence of the form

$$x_1^{n} + \dots + x_t^{n} \equiv N \pmod{p^k}, \quad 1 \le x_s \le P, \quad 1 \le s \le n, \quad P < p^k,$$

to a solution of the problem of distribution of fractional parts of a polynomial with integer coefficients modulo $p^k$. A.A. Karatsuba was the first to realize in the $p$-adic form the «embedding principle» of Euler-Vinogradov and to compute a $p$-adic analog of Vinogradov $u$-numbers when estimating the number of solutions of a congruence of the Waring type.

Assume that : $x_1^{n} + \dots + x_t^{n} \equiv N \pmod{Q}, \quad 1 \le x_s \le P, \quad 1 \le s \le t, \quad (1)$ and moreover : $P^r \le Q < P^{r+1}, \quad 1 \le r \le \frac{1}{12}\sqrt{n}, \quad Q = p^k, \quad k \ge 4(r+1)n,$ where $p$ is a prime number. Karatsuba proved that in that case for any natural number $n \ge 144$ there exists a $p_0 = p_0(n)$ such that for any $p_0 > p_0(n)$ every natural number $N$ can be represented in the form (1) for $t \ge 20r + 1$, and for $t < r$ there exist $N$ such that the congruence (1) has no solutions.

This new approach, found by Karatsuba, led to a new $p$-adic proof of the Vinogradov mean value theorem, which plays the central part in the Vinogradov's method of trigonometric sums.

Another component of the $p$-adic method of A.A. Karatsuba is the transition from incomplete systems of equations to complete ones at the expense of the local $p$-adic change of unknowns.

Let $r$ be an arbitrary natural number, $1 \le r \le n$. Determine an integer $t$ by the inequalities $m_t \le r \le m_{t+1}$. Consider the system of equations

$$\begin{cases}
x_1^{m_1} + \dots + x_k^{m_1} = y_1^{m_1} + \dots + y_k^{m_1}\\
\dots\dots\dots\dots\dots\dots\dots\dots \\
x_1^{m_s} + \dots + x_k^{m_s} = y_1^{m_s} + \dots + y_k^{m_s}\\
x_1^{n} + \dots + x_k^{n} = y_1^{n} + \dots + y_k^{n}
\end{cases}$$

$$1 \le x_1,\dots,x_k,y_1,\dots,y_k \le P, \quad 1 \le m_1 < m_2 < \dots < m_s < m_{s+1} = n.$$

Karatsuba proved that the number of solutions $I_k$ of this system of equations for $k \ge 6rn\log n$ satisfies the estimate

$$I_k \ll P^{2k-\delta}, \quad \delta = m_1 + \dots + m_t + (s-t+1)r.$$

For incomplete systems of equations, in which the variables run through numbers with small prime divisors, Karatsuba applied multiplicative translation of variables. This led to an essentially new estimate of trigonometric sums and a new mean value theorem for such systems of equations.

=== The Hua Luogeng problem on the convergency exponent of the singular integral in the Terry problem ===
$p$-adic method of A.A.Karatsuba includes the techniques of estimating the measure of the set of points with small values of functions in terms of the values of their parameters (coefficients etc.) and, conversely, the techniques of estimating those parameters in terms of the measure of this set in the real and $p$-adic metrics. This side of Karatsuba's method manifested itself especially clear in estimating trigonometric integrals, which led to the solution of the problem of Hua Luogeng. In 1979 Karatsuba, together with his students G.I. Arkhipov and V.N. Chubarikov obtained a complete solution of the Hua Luogeng problem of finding the exponent of convergency of the integral:

$$\vartheta_0=\int\limits_{-\infty}^{+\infty}\cdots\int\limits_{-\infty}^{+\infty}\biggl|\int\limits_{0}^{1}e^{2\pi i(\alpha_{n}x^{n}+\cdots
+\alpha_{1}x)}dx\biggr|^{2k}d\alpha_{n}\ldots d\alpha_{1},$$

where $n \ge 2$ is a fixed number.

In this case, the exponent of convergency means the value $\gamma$, such that $\vartheta_0$ converges for $2k > \gamma + \varepsilon$ and diverges for $2k < \gamma - \varepsilon$, where $\varepsilon > 0$ is arbitrarily small. It was shown that the integral $\vartheta_{0}$ converges for $2k > \tfrac{1}{2}(n^{2}+n)+1$ and diverges for $2k \le \tfrac{1}{2}(n^{2}+n)+1$.

At the same time, the similar problem for the integral was solved: $\vartheta_1=\int_{-\infty}^{+\infty}\cdots\int_{-\infty}^{+\infty}\biggl|\int_{0}^{1}e^{2\pi i(\alpha_n x^n + \alpha_m x^m + \cdots + \alpha_r x^r)}dx\biggr|^{2k}d\alpha_{n}d\alpha_{m}\ldots d\alpha_{r},$ where $n, m, \ldots, r$ are integers, satisfying the conditions : $1 \le r < \ldots < m < n, \quad r + \ldots + m + n < \tfrac{1}{2}(n^2+n).$

Karatsuba and his students proved that the integral $\vartheta_1$ converges, if $2k > n + m + \ldots + r$ and diverges, if $2k \le n + m + \ldots + r$.

The integrals $\vartheta_0$ and $\vartheta_1$ arise in the studying of the so-called Prouhet–Tarry–Escott problem. Karatsuba and his students obtained a series of new results connected with the multi-dimensional analog of the Tarry problem. In particular, they proved that if $F$ is a polynomial in $r$ variables ($r \ge 2$) of the form : $F(x_{1},\ldots, x_{r})\,=\,\sum\limits_{\nu_{1} = 0}^{n_{1}}\cdots \sum\limits_{\nu_{r} = 0}^{n_{r}}\alpha(\nu_{1},\ldots, \nu_{r})x_{1}^{\nu_{1}}\ldots x_{r}^{\nu_{r}},$ with the zero free term, $m = (n_{1}+1) \ldots (n_{r}+1)-1$, $\bar{\alpha}$ is the $m$-dimensional vector, consisting of the coefficients of $F$, then the integral : $\vartheta_{2}=\int\limits_{-\infty}^{+\infty}\cdots \int\limits_{-\infty}^{+\infty}\biggl|\int\limits_{0}^{1}\cdots\int\limits_{0}^{1}e^{2\pi iF(x_{1},\ldots, x_{r})}dx_{1}\ldots dx_{r}\biggr|^{2k}d\bar{\alpha}$ converges for $2k > mn$, where $n$ is the highest of the numbers $n_1, \ldots, n_r$. This result, being not a final one, generated a new area in the theory of trigonometric integrals, connected with improving the bounds of the exponent of convergency $\vartheta_2$ (I. A. Ikromov, M. A. Chahkiev and others).

=== Multiple trigonometric sums ===
In 1966–1980, Karatsuba developed (with participation of his students G.I. Arkhipov and V.N. Chubarikov) the theory of multiple Hermann Weyl trigonometric sums, that is, the sums of the form

$S = S(A) = \sum_{x_1=1}^{P_1}\dots\sum_{x_r=1}^{P_r}e^{2\pi i F(x_1,\dots,x_r)}$ , where $F(x_1,\dots,x_r) = \sum_{t_1=1}^{n_1}\dots\sum_{t_r=1}^{n_r}\alpha(t_1,\dots,t_r)x_1^{t_1}\dots x_r^{t_r}$ ,

$A$ is a system of real coefficients $\alpha(t_1,\dots,t_r)$. The central point of that theory, as in the theory of the Vinogradov trigonometric sums, is the following mean value theorem.

Let $n_1,\dots,n_r,P_1,\dots,P_r$ be natural numbers, $P_1 = \min(P_1,\dots,P_r)$,$m = (n_1+1)\dots(n_r+1)$. Furthermore, let $\Omega$ be the $m$-dimensional cube of the form :: $0 \le \alpha(t_1,\dots,t_r) < 1$ , $0 \le t_1 \le n_1, \dots,0 \le t_r \le n_r$, in the euclidean space : and :: $J = J(P_1,\dots,P_r;n_1,\dots,n_r;K,r) = \underset{\Omega}{\int\dots\int}|S(A)|^{2K} dA$ . : Then for any $\tau \ge 0$ and $K \ge K_{\tau} = m\tau$ the value $J$ can be estimated as follows

$J \le K_{\tau}^{2m\tau}\varkappa^{4\varkappa^2\Delta(\tau)}2^{8m\varkappa\tau}(P_1\dots P_r)^{2K}P^{-\varkappa\Delta(\tau)}$ , :

where $\varkappa = n_1\nu_1+ \dots + n_r\nu_r$ , $\gamma\varkappa = 1$, $\Delta(\tau) = \frac{m}{2}(1-(1-\gamma)^{\tau})$ , $P = (P_1^{n_1}\dots P_r^{n_r})^{\gamma}$, and the natural numbers $\nu_1, \dots , \nu_r$ are such that: :: $-1 < \frac{P_s}{P_1} - \nu_s \le 0$ , $s= 1,\dots , r$ .

The mean value theorem and the lemma on the multiplicity of intersection of multi-dimensional parallelepipeds form the basis of the estimate of a multiple trigonometric sum, that was obtained by Karatsuba (two-dimensional case was derived by G.I. Arkhipov). Denoting by $Q_0$ the least common multiple of the numbers $q(t_1,\dots,t_r)$ with the condition $t_1 + \dots t_r \ge 1$, for $Q_0 \ge P^{1/6}$ the estimate holds

$$|S(A)| \le (5n^{2n})^{r\nu(Q_0)}(\tau(Q_0))^{r-1}P_1\dots P_rQ^{-0.1\mu} + 2^{8r}(r\mu^{-1})^{r-1}P_1\dots P_rP^{-0.05\mu}$$,

where $\tau(Q)$ is the number of divisors of the integer $Q$, and $\nu(Q)$ is the number of distinct prime divisors of the number $Q$.

=== The estimate of the Hardy function in the Waring problem ===
Applying his $p$-adic form of the Hardy-Littlewood-Ramanujan-Vinogradov method to estimating trigonometric sums, in which the summation is taken over numbers with small prime divisors, Karatsuba obtained a new estimate of the well known Hardy function $G(n)$ in the Waring's problem (for $n \ge 400$):

$$\! G(n) < 2 n\log n + 2 n\log\log n + 12 n.$$

=== Multi-dimensional analog of the Waring problem ===
In his subsequent investigation of the Waring problem Karatsuba obtained the following two-dimensional generalization of that problem:

Consider the system of equations

$x_1^{n-i}y_1^i + \dots + x_k^{n-i}y_k^i = N_i$ , $i = 0,1,\dots, n$ ,

where $N_i$ are given positive integers with the same order or growth, $N_0 \to +\infty$, and $x_{\varkappa},y_{\varkappa}$ are unknowns, which are also positive integers. This system has solutions, if $k > cn^2\log n$ , and if $k < c_1n^2$, then there exist such $N_i$, that the system has no solutions.

=== The Artin problem of local representation of zero by a form ===
Emil Artin had posed the problem on the $p$-adic representation of zero by a form of arbitrary degree d. Artin initially conjectured a result, which would now be described as the p-adic field being a C_{2} field; in other words non-trivial representation of zero would occur if the number of variables was at least d^{2}. This was shown not to be the case by an example of Guy Terjanian. Karatsuba showed that, in order to have a non-trivial representation of zero by a form, the number of variables should grow faster than polynomially in the degree d; this number in fact should have an almost exponential growth, depending on the degree. Karatsuba and his student Arkhipov proved, that for any natural number $r$ there exists $n_0 = n_0(r)$, such that for any $n \ge n_0$ there is a form with integral coefficients $F(x_1,\dots,x_k)$ of degree smaller than $n$, the number of variables of which is $k$, $k \ge 2^u$,

$$u = \frac{n}{(\log_2n)(\log_2\log_2n) \dots \underbrace{(\log_2\dots\log_2n)}_r\underbrace{(\log_2\dots\log_2n)^3}_{r+1}}$$

which has only trivial representation of zero in the 2-adic numbers. They also obtained a similar result for any odd prime modulus $p$.

=== Estimates of short Kloosterman sums ===
Karatsuba developed (1993—1999) a new method of estimating short Kloosterman sums, that is, trigonometric sums of the form

$$\sum\limits_{n\in A}\exp{\biggl(2\pi i\,\frac{an^{*}+bn}{m}\biggr)},$$

where $n$ runs through a set $A$ of numbers, coprime to $m$, the number of elements $\|A\|$ in which is essentially smaller than $m$, and the symbol $n^{*}$ denotes the congruence class, inverse to $n$ modulo $m$: $nn^{*}\equiv 1(\mod m)$.

Up to the early 1990s, the estimates of this type were known, mainly, for sums in which the number of summands was higher than $\sqrt{m}$ (H. D. Kloosterman, I. M. Vinogradov, H. Salié, L. Carlitz, S. Uchiyama, A. Weil). The only exception was the special moduli of the form $m = p^{\alpha}$, where $p$ is a fixed prime and the exponent $\alpha$ increases to infinity (this case was studied by A. G. Postnikov by means of the method of Vinogradov). Karatsuba's method makes it possible to estimate Kloosterman sums where the number of summands does not exceed

$$m^{\varepsilon},$$

and in some cases even

$$\exp{\{(\ln m)^{2/3+\varepsilon}\}},$$

where $\varepsilon > 0$ is an arbitrarily small fixed number. The final paper of Karatsuba on this subject was published posthumously.

Various aspects of the method of Karatsuba have found applications in the following problems of analytic number theory:

- finding asymptotics of the sums of fractional parts of the form : ${\sum_{n\le x}}'\biggl\{\frac{an^{*}+bn}{m}\biggr\}, {\sum_{p\le x}}'\biggl\{\frac{ap^{*}+bp}{m}\biggr\},$ : where $n$ runs, one after another, through the integers satisfying the condition $(n,m)=1$, and $p$ runs through the primes that do not divide the module $m$ (Karatsuba);
- finding a lower bound for the number of solutions of inequalities of the form : $\alpha<\biggl\{\frac{an^{*}+bn}{m}\biggr\}\le\beta$ : in the integers $n$, $1\le n\le x$, coprime to $m$, $x<\sqrt{m}$ (Karatsuba);
- the precision of approximation of an arbitrary real number in the segment $[0,1]$ by fractional parts of the form :

$\biggl\{\frac{an^{*}+bn}{m}\biggr\},$ : where $1\le n\le x$, $(n,m)=1$, $x<\sqrt{m}$ (Karatsuba);

- a more precise constant $c$ in the Brun–Titchmarsh theorem :

$\pi(x;q,l)< \frac{cx}{\varphi(q)\ln\frac{2x}{q}},$ : where $\pi(x;q,l)$ is the number of primes $p$, not exceeding $x$ and belonging to the arithmetic progression $p\equiv l \pmod{q}$ (J. Friedlander, H. Iwaniec);

- a lower bound for the greatest prime divisor of the product of numbers of the form :

$n^{3}+2$, $N<n\le 2N$ (D. R. Heath-Brown);

- proving that there are infinitely many primes of the form:

$a^{2}+b^{4}$ (J. Friedlander, H. Iwaniec);

- combinatorial properties of the set of numbers :

$n^{*} \pmod{m}$ $1 \le n \le m^{\varepsilon}$ (A. A. Glibichuk).

=== The Riemann zeta function ===
==== The Selberg zeroes ====
In 1984 Karatsuba proved, that for a fixed $\varepsilon$ satisfying the condition $0<\varepsilon < 0.001$, a sufficiently large $T$ and $H = T^{a+\varepsilon}$, $a = \tfrac{27}{82} = \tfrac{1}{3} -\tfrac{1}{246}$, the interval $(T,T+H)$ contains at least $cH\ln T$ real zeros of the Riemann zeta function $\zeta\Bigl(\tfrac{1}{2}+it\Bigr)$.

The special case $H\ge T^{1/2+\varepsilon}$ was proven by Atle Selberg earlier in 1942. The estimates of Atle Selberg and Karatsuba can not be improved in respect of the order of growth as $T\to +\infty$.

==== Distribution of zeros of the Riemann zeta function on the short intervals of the critical line ====
Karatsuba also obtained a number of results about the distribution of zeros of $\zeta(s)$ on «short» intervals of the critical line. He proved that an analog of the Selberg conjecture holds for «almost all» intervals $(T,T+H]$, $H = T^{\varepsilon}$, where $\varepsilon$ is an arbitrarily small fixed positive number. Karatsuba developed (1992) a new approach to investigating zeros of the Riemann zeta-function on «supershort» intervals of the critical line, that is, on the intervals $(T,T+H]$, the length $H$ of which grows slower than any, even arbitrarily small degree $T$. In particular, he proved that for any given numbers $\varepsilon$, $\varepsilon_{1}$ satisfying the conditions $0<\varepsilon, \varepsilon_{1}<1$ almost all intervals $(T,T+H]$ for $H\ge\exp{\{(\ln T)^{\varepsilon}\}}$ contain at least $H(\ln T)^{1-\varepsilon_{1}}$ zeros of the function $\zeta\bigl(\tfrac{1}{2}+it\bigr)$. This estimate is quite close to the one that follows from the Riemann hypothesis.

==== Zeros of linear combinations of Dirichlet L-series ====
Karatsuba developed a new method of investigating zeros of functions which can be represented as linear combinations of Dirichlet $L$-series. The simplest example of a function of that type is the Davenport-Heilbronn function, defined by the equality

$$f(s)=\tfrac{1}{2}(1-i\kappa)L(s,\chi)+\tfrac{1}{2}(1 \,+\,i\kappa)L(s,\bar{\chi}),$$

where $\chi$ is a non-principal character modulo $5$ ($\chi(1) = 1$, $\chi(2) = i$, $\chi(3) = -i$, $\chi(4) = -1$, $\chi(5) = 0$, $\chi(n+5) = \chi(n)$ for any $n$),

$$\kappa=\frac{\sqrt{10-2\sqrt{5}}-2}{\sqrt{5}-1}.$$

For $f(s)$ Riemann hypothesis is not true, however, the critical line $Re \ s = \tfrac{1}{2}$ contains, nevertheless, abnormally many zeros.

Karatsuba proved (1989) that the interval $(T, T+H]$, $H = T^{27/82+\varepsilon}$, contains at least

$$H(\ln T)^{1/2}e^{-c\sqrt{\ln\ln T}}$$

zeros of the function $f\bigl(\tfrac{1}{2}+it\bigr)$. Similar results were obtained by Karatsuba also for linear combinations containing arbitrary (finite) number of summands; the degree exponent $\tfrac{1}{2}$ is here replaced by a smaller number $\beta$, that depends only on the form of the linear combination.

==== The boundary of zeros of the zeta function and the multi-dimensional problem of Dirichlet divisors ====
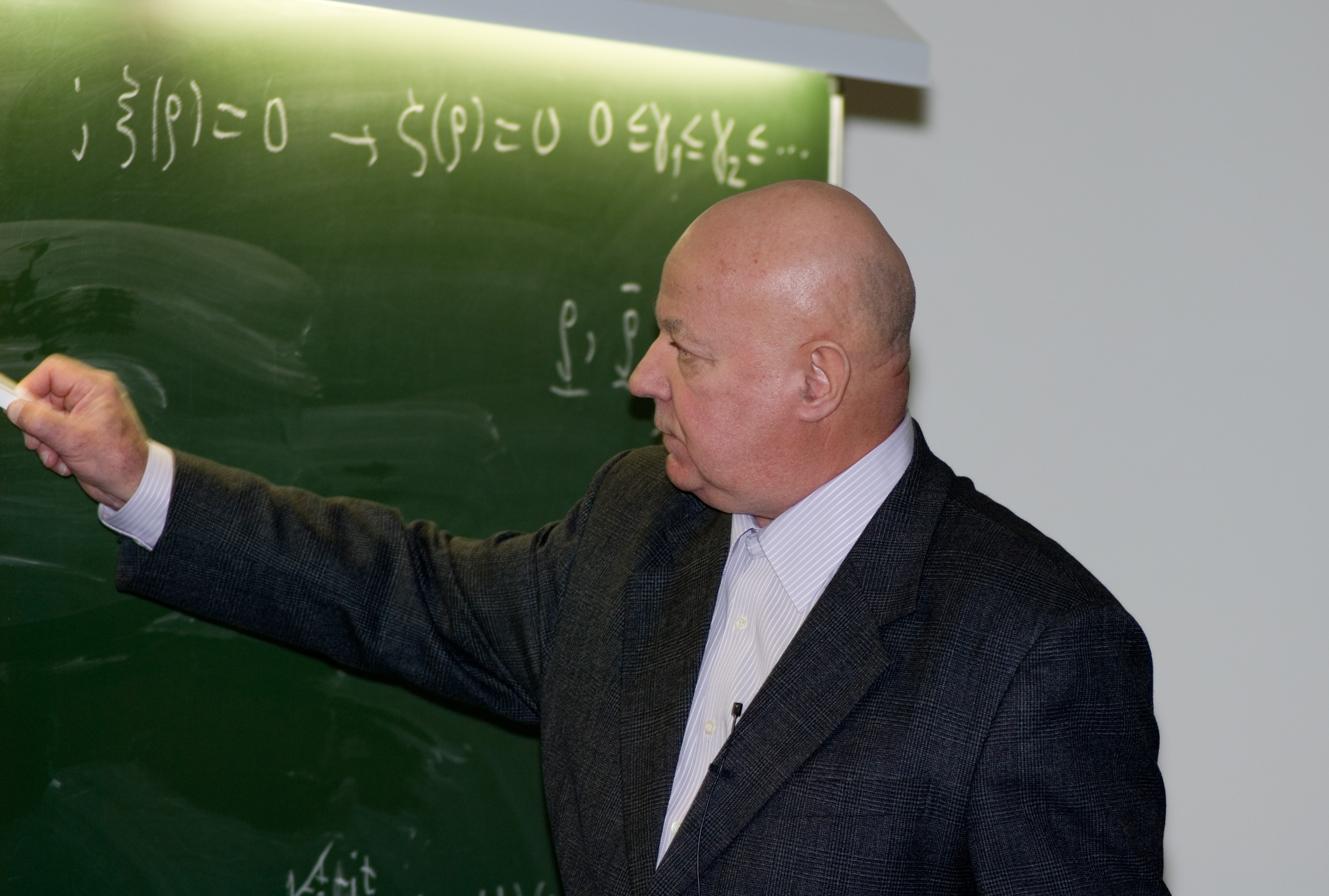

To Karatsuba belongs a new breakthrough result in the multi-dimensional problem of Dirichlet divisors, which is connected with finding the number $D_{k}(x)$ of solutions of the inequality $x_{1}*\ldots *x_{k}\le x$ in the natural numbers $x_{1}, \ldots, x_{k}$ as $x\to +\infty$. For $D_{k}(x)$ there is an asymptotic formula of the form

$$D_{k}(x) = xP_{k-1}(\ln x)+R_{k}(x)$$,

where $P_{k-1}(u)$ is a polynomial of degree $(k-1)$, the coefficients of which depend on $k$ and can be found explicitly and $R_{k}(x)$ is the remainder term, all known estimates of which (up to 1960) were of the form

$$|R_{k}(x)| \le x^{1-\alpha(k)}(c\ln x)^{k}$$,

where $\alpha = \frac{1}{ak+b}$, $a,b,c$ are some absolute positive constants.

Karatsuba obtained a more precise estimate of $R_{k}(x)$, in which the value $\alpha(k)$ was of order $k^{-2/3}$ and was decreasing much slower than $\alpha(k)$ in the previous estimates. Karatsuba's estimate is uniform in $x$ and $k$; in particular, the value $k$ may grow as $x$ grows (as some power of the logarithm of $x$). (A similar looking, but weaker result was obtained in 1960 by a German mathematician Richert, whose paper remained unknown to Soviet mathematicians at least until the mid-seventies.)

Proof of the estimate of $R_{k}(x)$ is based on a series of claims, essentially equivalent to the theorem on the boundary of zeros of the Riemann zeta function, obtained by the method of Vinogradov, that is, the theorem claiming that $\zeta(s)$ has no zeros in the region

$$Re \ s \ge 1 - \frac{c}{(\ln |t|)^{2/3}(\ln\ln |t|)^{1/3}},\quad |t|> 10$$.

Karatsuba found (2000) the backward relation of estimates of the values $R_{k}(x)$ with the behaviour of $\zeta(s)$ near the line $Re \ s = 1$. In particular, he proved that if $\alpha(y)$ is an arbitrary non-increasing function satisfying the condition $1/y \le \alpha(y)\le 1/2$, such that for all $k\ge 2$ the estimate

$$|R_{k}(x)| \le x^{1-\alpha(k)}(c\ln x)^{k}$$

holds, then $\zeta(s)$ has no zeros in the region

$$Re \ s \ge 1 - c_{1}\,\frac{\alpha(\ln |t|)}{\ln\ln |t|},\quad |t|\ge e^{2}$$

($c, c_{1}$ are some absolute constants).

==== Estimates from below of the maximum of the modulus of the zeta function in small regions of the critical domain and on small intervals of the critical line ====
Karatsuba introduced and studied the functions $F(T;H)$ and $G(s_{0};\Delta)$, defined by the equalities

$$F(T;H) = \max_{|t-T|\le H}\bigl|\zeta\bigl(\tfrac{1}{2}+it\bigr)\bigr|,\quad G(s_{0};\Delta) = \max_{|s-s_{0}|\le\Delta}|\zeta(s)|.$$

Here $T$ is a sufficiently large positive number, $0<H\ll \ln\ln T$, $s_{0} = \sigma_{0}+iT$, $\tfrac{1}{2}\le\sigma_{0}\le 1$, $0<\Delta < \tfrac{1}{3}$. Estimating the values $F$ and $G$ from below shows, how large (in modulus) values $\zeta(s)$ can take on short intervals of the critical line or in small neighborhoods of points lying in the critical strip $0\le Re \ s\le 1$. The case $H\gg \ln\ln T$ was studied earlier by Ramachandra; the case $\Delta > c$, where $c$ is a sufficiently large constant, is trivial.

Karatsuba proved, in particular, that if the values $H$ and $\Delta$ exceed certain sufficiently small constants, then the estimates

$F(T;H) \ge T^{- c_{1}},\quad G(s_{0}; \Delta) \ge T^{-c_{2}},$

hold, where $c_{1}, c_{2}$ are certain absolute constants.

==== Behaviour of the argument of the zeta-function on the critical line ====
Karatsuba obtained a number of new results related to the behaviour of the function $S(t) = \frac{1}{\pi}\arg{\zeta\bigl(\tfrac{1}{2}+it\bigr)}$, which is called the argument of Riemann zeta function on the critical line (here $\arg{\zeta\bigl(\tfrac{1}{2}+it\bigr)}$ is the increment of an arbitrary continuous branch of $\arg\zeta(s)$ along the broken line joining the points $2, 2+it$ and $\tfrac{1}{2}+it$). Among those results are the mean value theorems for the function $S(t)$ and its first integral $S_{1}(t) = \int_{0}^{t}S(u)du$ on intervals of the real line, and also the theorem claiming that every interval $(T,T+H]$ for $H \ge T^{27/82+\varepsilon}$ contains at least

$$H(\ln T)^{1/3}e^{-c\sqrt{\ln\ln T}}$$

points where the function $S(t)$ changes sign. Earlier similar results were obtained by Atle Selberg for the case $H\ge T^{1/2+\varepsilon}$.

=== The Dirichlet characters ===
==== Estimates of short sums of characters in finite fields ====
In the end of the sixties Karatsuba, estimating short sums of Dirichlet characters, developed a new method, making it possible to obtain non-trivial estimates of short sums of characters in finite fields. Let $n\ge 2$ be a fixed integer, $F(x) = x^{n}+a_{n-1}x^{n-1}+\ldots + a_{1}x + a_{0}$ a polynomial, irreducible over the field $\mathbb{Q}$ of rational numbers, $\theta$ a root of the equation $F(\theta) = 0$, $\mathbb{Q}(\theta)$ the corresponding extension of the field $\mathbb{Q}$, $\omega_{1},\ldots, \omega_{n}$ a basis of $\mathbb{Q}(\theta)$, $\omega_{1} = 1$, $\omega_{2} = \theta$, $\omega_{3} = \theta^{2},\ldots, \omega_{n} = \theta^{n-1}$. Furthermore, let $p$ be a sufficiently large prime, such that $F(x)$ is irreducible modulo $p$, $\mathrm{GF}(p^{n})$ the Galois field with a basis $\omega_{1}, \omega_{2}, \ldots,\omega_{n}$, $\chi$ a non-principal Dirichlet character of the field $\mathrm{GF}(p^{n})$. Finally, let $\nu_{1},\ldots, \nu_{n}$ be some nonnegative integers, $D(X)$ the set of elements $\bar{x}$ of the Galois field $\mathrm{GF}(p^{n})$,

$$\bar{x} = x_{1}\omega_{1} + \ldots + x_{n}\omega_{n}$$,

such that for any $i$, $1\le i\le n$, the following inequalities hold:

$$\nu_{i} < x_{i} < \nu_{i} + X$$.

Karatsuba proved that for any fixed $k$, $k\ge n+1$, and arbitrary $X$ satisfying the condition

$$p^{\frac{1}{4}+\frac{1}{4k}} \le X \le p^{\frac{1}{2}+\frac{1}{4k}}$$

the following estimate holds:

$$\biggl|\sum\limits_{\bar{x}\in D(X)}\chi(\bar{x})\biggr|\le c\Bigl(X^{1-\frac{1}{k}}p^{\frac{1}{4k}+\frac{1}{ 4k^{2}}}\Bigr)^{\!\!n}(\ln p)^{\gamma},$$

where $\gamma = \frac{1}{k}(2^{n+1}-1)$, and the constant $c$ depends only on $n$ and the basis $\omega_{1},\ldots, \omega_{n}$.

==== Estimates of linear sums of characters over shifted prime numbers ====
Karatsuba developed a number of new tools, which, combined with the Vinogradov method of estimating sums with prime numbers, enabled him to obtain in 1970 an estimate of the sum of values of a non-principal character modulo a prime $q$ on a sequence of shifted prime numbers, namely, an estimate of the form

$$\biggl|\sum\limits_{p\le N}\chi(p+k)\biggr|\le cNq^{-\frac{\varepsilon^{2}}{1024}},$$

where $k$ is an integer satisfying the condition $k\not\equiv 0 (\mod q)$, $\varepsilon$ an arbitrarily small fixed number, $N\ge q^{1/2+\varepsilon}$, and the constant $c$ depends on $\varepsilon$ only.

This claim is considerably stronger than the estimate of Vinogradov, which is non-trivial for $N\ge q^{3/4+\varepsilon}$.

In 1971 speaking at the International conference on number theory on the occasion of the 80th birthday of Ivan Matveyevich Vinogradov, Academician Yuri Linnik noted the following:

«Of a great importance are the investigations carried out by Vinogradov in the area of asymptotics of Dirichlet character on shifted primes $\sum\limits_{p\le N}\chi(p+k)$, which give a decreased power compared to $N$ compared to $N\ge q^{3/4+\varepsilon}$, $\varepsilon > 0$, where $q$ is the modulus of the character. This estimate is of crucial importance, as it is so deep that gives more than the extended Riemann hypothesis, and, it seems, in that directions is a deeper fact than that conjecture (if the conjecture is true). Recently this estimate was improved by A.A.Karatsuba».

This result was extended by Karatsuba to the case when $p$ runs through the primes in an arithmetic progression, the increment of which grows with the modulus $q$.

==== Estimates of sums of characters on polynomials with a prime argument ====
Karatsuba found a number of estimates of sums of Dirichlet characters in polynomials of degree two for the case when the argument of the polynomial runs through a short sequence of subsequent primes. Let, for instance, $q$ be a sufficiently high prime, $f(x) = (x-a)(x-b)$, where $a$ and $b$ are integers, satisfying the condition $ab(a-b)\not\equiv 0 (\mod q)$, and let $\left(\frac{n}{q}\right)$ denote the Legendre symbol, then for any fixed $\varepsilon$ with the condition $0<\varepsilon<\tfrac{1}{2}$ and $N>q^{3/4+\varepsilon}$ for the sum $S_{N}$,

$$S_{N} = \sum\limits_{p\le N}\biggl(\frac{f(p)}{q}\biggr),$$

the following estimate holds:

$$|S_{N}| \le c\pi(N)q^{-\frac{\varepsilon^{2}}{100}}$$

(here $p$ runs through subsequent primes, $\pi(N)$ is the number of primes not exceeding $N$, and $c$ is a constant, depending on $\varepsilon$ only).

A similar estimate was obtained by Karatsuba also for the case when $p$ runs through a sequence of primes in an arithmetic progression, the increment of which may grow together with the modulus $q$.

Karatsuba conjectured that the non-trivial estimate of the sum $S_{N}$ for $N$, which are "small" compared to $q$, remains true in the case when $f(x)$ is replaced by an arbitrary polynomial of degree $n$, which is not a square modulo $q$. This conjecture is still open.

==== Lower bounds for sums of characters in polynomials ====
Karatsuba constructed an infinite sequence of primes $p$ and a sequence of polynomials $f(x)$ of degree $n$ with integer coefficients, such that $f(x)$ is not a full square modulo $p$,

$$\frac{4(p-1)}{\ln p} \le n \le \frac{8(p-1)}{\ln p},$$

and such that

$$\sum\limits_{x =1}^{p}\left(\frac{f(x)}{p}\right) = p.$$

In other words, for any $x$ the value $f(x)$ turns out to be a quadratic residues modulo $p$. This result shows that André Weil's estimate

$\biggl|\sum\limits_{x=1}^{p}\left(\frac{f(x)}{p}\right)\biggr| \le (n-1)\sqrt{p}$

cannot be essentially improved and the right hand side of the latter inequality cannot be replaced by say the value $C\sqrt{n}\sqrt{p}$, where $C$ is an absolute constant.

==== Sums of characters on additive sequences ====
Karatsuba found a new method, making it possible to obtain rather precise estimates of sums of values of non-principal Dirichlet characters on additive sequences, that is, on sequences consisting of numbers of the form $x+y$, where the variables $x$ and $y$ runs through some sets $A$ and $B$ independently of each other. The most characteristic example of that kind is the following claim which is applied in solving a wide class of problems, connected with summing up values of Dirichlet characters. Let $\varepsilon$ be an arbitrarily small fixed number, $0<\varepsilon<\tfrac{1}{2}$, $q$ a sufficiently large prime, $\chi$ a non-principal character modulo $q$. Furthermore, let $A$ and $B$ be arbitrary subsets of the complete system of congruence classes modulo $q$, satisfying only the conditions $\|A\|>q^{\varepsilon}$, $\|B\|>q^{1/2+\varepsilon}$. Then the following estimate holds:

$$\biggl|\sum\limits_{x\in A}\sum\limits_{y\in B}\chi(x+y)\biggr|\le c\|A\|\cdot\|B\| q^{-\frac{\varepsilon^{2}}{20}},\quad c = c(\varepsilon)>0.$$

Karatsuba's method makes it possible to obtain non-trivial estimates of that sort in certain other cases when the conditions for the sets $A$ and $B$, formulated above, are replaced by different ones, for example: $\|A\|>q^{\varepsilon}$, $\sqrt{\|A\|}\cdot\|B\|> q^{1/2+\varepsilon}.$

In the case when $A$ and $B$ are the sets of primes in intervals $(1,X]$, $(1,Y]$ respectively, where $X\ge q^{1/4+\varepsilon}$, $Y\ge q^{1/4+\varepsilon}$, an estimate of the form

$$\biggl|\sum\limits_{p\le X}\sum\limits_{p'\le Y}\chi(p+p')\biggr|\le c\pi(X)\pi(Y)q^{-c_{1}\varepsilon^{2}},$$

holds, where $\pi(Z)$ is the number of primes, not exceeding $Z$, $c = c(\varepsilon)>0$, and $c_{1}$ is some absolute constant.

==== Distribution of power congruence classes and primitive roots in sparse sequences ====
Karatsuba obtained (2000) non-trivial estimates of sums of values of Dirichlet characters "with weights", that is, sums of components of the form $\chi(n)f(n)$, where $f(n)$ is a function of natural argument. Estimates of that sort are applied in solving a wide class of problems of number theory, connected with distribution of power congruence classes, also primitive roots in certain sequences.

Let $k\ge 2$ be an integer, $q$ a sufficiently large prime, $(a,q) = 1$, $|a|\le \sqrt{q}$, $N\ge q^{\frac{1}{2} - \frac{1}{2(k+1)}+\varepsilon}$, where $0<\varepsilon<\min{\{0.01, \tfrac{2}{3(k+1)}\}}$, and set, finally,

$$D_{k}(x) = \sum\limits_{x_{1}*\ldots *x_{k}\le x}1 = \sum\limits_{n\le x}\tau_{k}(n)$$

(for an asymptotic expression for $D_{k}(x)$, see above, in the section on the multi-dimensional problem of Dirichlet divisors). For the sums $V_{1}(x)$ and $V_{2}(x)$ of the values $\tau_{k}(n)$, extended on the values $n \le x$, for which the numbers $(n+a)$ are quadratic residues (respectively, non-residues) modulo $q$, Karatsuba obtained asymptotic formulas of the form

$$V_{1}(x) = \tfrac{1}{2}D_{k}(x) + O\bigl(xq^{-0.01\varepsilon^{2}}\bigr),\quad V_{2}(x) = \tfrac{1}{2}D_{k}(x) + O\bigl(xq^{-0.01\varepsilon^{2}}\bigr)$$.

Similarly, for the sum $V(x)$ of values $\tau_{k}(n)$, taken over all $n\le x$, for which $(n+a)$ is a primitive root modulo $q$, one gets an asymptotic expression of the form

$$V(x) = \left(1 - \frac{1}{p_{1}}\right)\ldots \left(1 - \frac{1}{p_{s}}\right)D_{k}(x) + O\bigl(xq^{-0.01\varepsilon^{2}}\bigr)$$,

where $p_{1},\ldots, p_{s}$ are all prime divisors of the number $q-1$.

Karatsuba applied his method also to the problems of distribution of power residues (non-residues) in the sequences of shifted primes $p+a$, of the integers of the type $x^{2}+y^{2}+a$ and some others.

== Late work ==
In his later years, apart from his research in number theory (see Karatsuba phenomenon), Karatsuba studied certain problems of theoretical physics, in particular in the area of quantum field theory. Applying his ATS theorem and some other number-theoretic approaches, he obtained new results in the Jaynes–Cummings model in quantum optics.

== Awards and titles ==
- 1981: P.L.Tchebyshev Prize of Soviet Academy of Sciences
- 1999: Distinguished Scientist of Russia
- 2001: I.M.Vinogradov Prize of Russian Academy of Sciences

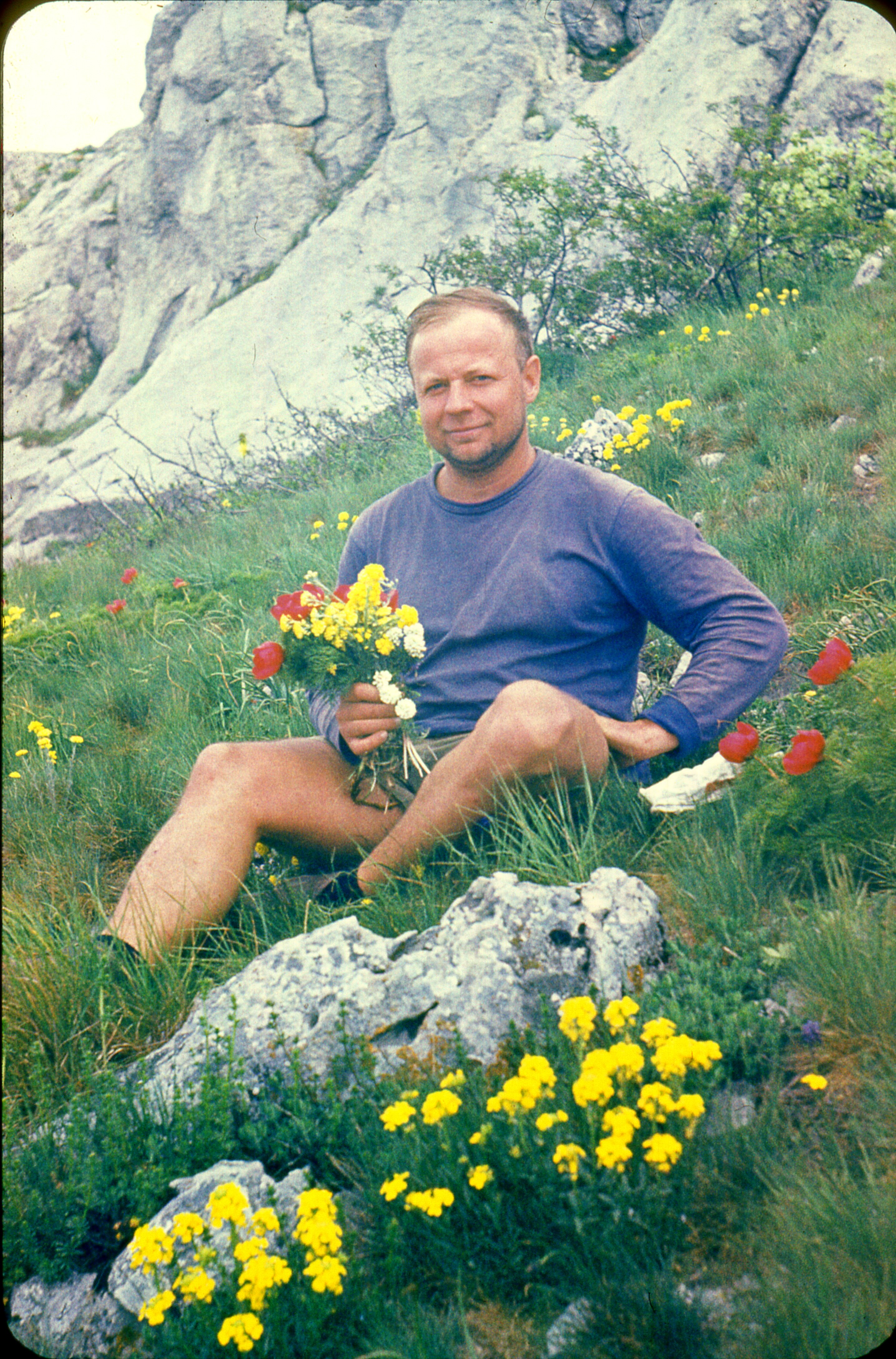
In Crimea

== See also ==
- ATS theorem
- Karatsuba algorithm
- Moore machine
