= Kloosterman sum =

Particular kind of exponential sum

In mathematics, a Kloosterman sum is a particular kind of exponential sum. They are named for the Dutch mathematician Hendrik Kloosterman, who introduced them in 1926 when he adapted the Hardy–Littlewood circle method to tackle a problem involving positive definite diagonal quadratic forms in four variables, strengthening his 1924 dissertation research on five or more variables.

Let a, b, m be natural numbers. Then

$$K(a,b;m)=\sum_{\stackrel{0\leq x\leq m-1}{\gcd(x,m)=1}} e^{\frac{2\pi i}{m} (ax+bx^*)}.$$

Here x* is the inverse of x modulo m.

== Context ==
The Kloosterman sums are a finite ring analogue of Bessel functions. They occur (for example) in the Fourier expansion of modular forms.

There are applications to mean values involving the Riemann zeta function, primes in short intervals, primes in arithmetic progressions, the spectral theory of automorphic functions and related topics.

== Properties of the Kloosterman sums ==
- If a = 0 or b = 0 then the Kloosterman sum reduces to the Ramanujan sum.
- K(a, b; m) depends only on the residue class of a and b modulo m. Furthermore K(a, b; m) = K(b, a; m) and K(ac, b; m) = K(a, bc; m) if gcd(c, m) = 1.
- Let m = m_{1}m_{2} with m_{1} and m_{2} coprime. Choose n_{1} and n_{2} such that n_{1}m_{1} ≡ 1 mod m_{2} and n_{2}m_{2} ≡ 1 mod m_{1}. Then

$$K(a,b;m) = K \left (n_2 a, n_2 b; m_1 \right ) K \left (n_1 a, n_1 b; m_2 \right ).$$

This reduces the evaluation of Kloosterman sums to the case where m = p^{k} for a prime number p and an integer k ≥ 1.

- The value of K(a, b; m) is always an algebraic real number. In fact K(a, b; m) is an element of the subfield $K\subset\R$ which is the compositum of the fields

$$\Q \left(\zeta_{p^\alpha}+\zeta_{p^\alpha}^{-1} \right )$$

where p ranges over all odd primes such that p^{α} || m and

$$\Q \left (\zeta_{2^{\alpha-1}} + \zeta_{2^{\alpha-1}}^{-1} \right )$$

for 2^{α} || m with α > 3.

- The Selberg identity:

$$K(a,b;m) = \sum_{d\mid\gcd(a,b,m)} d\cdot K\left(\tfrac{ab}{d^2},1;\tfrac{m}{d}\right).$$

was stated by Atle Selberg and first proved by Kuznetsov using the spectral theory of modular forms. Nowadays elementary proofs of this identity are known.

- For p an odd prime, there are no known simple formula for K(a, b; p), and the Sato–Tate conjecture suggests that none exist. The lifting formulas below, however, are often as good as an explicit evaluation. If gcd(a, p) = 1 one also has the important transformation:

$$K(a,a;p) = \sum_{m=0}^{p-1} \left(\frac{m^2-4a^2}{p}\right) e^{\frac{2\pi i m}{p}},$$

where $\left(\tfrac{\ell}{m}\right)$ denotes the Jacobi symbol.

- Let m = p^{k} with k > 1, p prime and assume gcd(p, 2ab) = 1. Then:

$$K(a,b; m) = \begin{cases} 2 \left(\frac{\ell}{m}\right) \sqrt{m} \text{ Re}\left(\varepsilon_{m} e^{\frac{4 \pi i \ell}{m}} \right) & \left(\tfrac{a}{p}\right)=\left(\tfrac{b}{p}\right) \\ 0 & \text{otherwise} \end{cases}$$

where ℓ is chosen so that ℓ^{2} ≡ ab mod m and ε_{m} is defined as follows (note that m is odd):

$$\varepsilon_m = \begin{cases} 1 & m \equiv 1 \bmod 4 \\ i & m \equiv 3 \bmod 4 \end{cases}$$

This formula was first found by Hans Salie and there are many simple proofs in the literature.

== Estimates ==
Because Kloosterman sums occur in the Fourier expansion of modular forms, estimates for Kloosterman sums yield estimates for Fourier coefficients of modular forms as well. The most famous estimate is due to André Weil and states:

$$|K(a,b;m)|\leq \tau(m) \sqrt{\gcd(a,b,m)} \sqrt{m}.$$

Here $\tau(m)$ is the number of positive divisors of m. Because of the multiplicative properties of Kloosterman sums these estimates may be reduced to the case where m is a prime number p. A fundamental technique of Weil reduces the estimate

$$|K(a,b;p)|\leq 2 \sqrt{p},$$

when ab ≠ 0 to his results on local zeta-functions. Geometrically the sum is taken along a 'hyperbola' XY = ab and we consider this as defining an algebraic curve over the finite field with p elements. This curve has a ramified Artin–Schreier covering C, and Weil showed that the local zeta-function of C has a factorization; this is the Artin L-function theory for the case of global fields that are function fields, for which Weil gives a 1938 paper of J. Weissinger as reference (the next year he gave a 1935 paper of Hasse as earlier reference for the idea; given Weil's rather denigratory remark on the abilities of analytic number theorists to work out this example themselves, in his Collected Papers, these ideas were presumably 'folklore' of quite long standing). The non-polar factors are of type 1 − Kt, where K is a Kloosterman sum. The estimate then follows from Weil's basic work of 1940.

This technique in fact shows much more generally that complete exponential sums 'along' algebraic varieties have good estimates, depending on the Weil conjectures in dimension > 1. It has been pushed much further by Pierre Deligne, Gérard Laumon, and Nicholas Katz.

== Short Kloosterman sums ==
Short Kloosterman sums are defined as trigonometric sums of the form

$$\sum_{n\in A}\exp \left (2\pi i \frac{an^*+bn}{m} \right),$$

where n runs through a set A of numbers, coprime to m, the number of elements $\|A\|$ in which is essentially smaller than m, and the symbol $n^*$ denotes the congruence class, inverse to n modulo m: $nn^*\equiv 1 \bmod m.$

Up to the early 1990s, estimates for sums of this type were known mainly in the case where the number of summands was greater than √m. Such estimates were due to H. D. Kloosterman, I. M. Vinogradov, H. Salie, L. Carlitz, S. Uchiyama and A. Weil. The only exceptions were the special modules of the form m = p^{α}, where p is a fixed prime and the exponent α increases to infinity (this case was studied by A.G. Postnikov by means of the method of Ivan Matveyevich Vinogradov).

In the 1990s Anatolii Alexeevitch Karatsuba developed a new method of estimating short Kloosterman sums. Karatsuba's method makes it possible to estimate Kloosterman's sums, the number of summands in which does not exceed $m^{\varepsilon}$, and in some cases even $\exp\{(\ln m)^{2/3+\varepsilon}\}$, where $\varepsilon > 0$ is an arbitrarily small fixed number. The last paper of A.A. Karatsuba on this subject was published after his death.

Various aspects of the method of Karatsuba found applications in solving the following problems of analytic number theory:

- finding asymptotics of the sums of fractional parts of the form:

$${\sum_{n\le x}}'\left\{\frac{an^*+bn}{m}\right\}, {\sum_{p\le x}}'\left\{\frac{ap^*+bp}{m}\right\},$$

where n runs, one after another, through the integers satisfying the condition $(n,m)=1$, and p runs through the primes that do not divide the module m (A.A.Karatsuba);

- finding the lower bound for the number of solutions of the inequalities of the form:

$$\alpha<\left\{\frac{an^*+bn}{m}\right\}\le\beta$$

in the integers n, 1 ≤ n ≤ x, coprime to m, $x<\sqrt{m}$ (A.A. Karatsuba);

- the precision of approximation of an arbitrary real number in the segment [0, 1] by fractional parts of the form:

$$\left\{\frac{an^*+bn}{m}\right\},$$

where $1\le n\le x, (n,m)=1, x<\sqrt{m}$ (A.A. Karatsuba);

- a more precise constant c in the Brun–Titchmarsh theorem :

$$\pi(x;q,l)< \frac{cx}{\varphi(q)\ln\frac{2x}{q}},$$

where $\pi(x;q,l)$ is the number of primes p, not exceeding x and belonging to the arithmetic progression $p\equiv l \bmod{q}$ (J. Friedlander, H. Iwaniec);

- a lower bound for the greatest prime divisor of the product of numbers of the form: n^{3} + 2, N < n ≤ 2N.(D. R. Heath-Brown);
- proving that there are infinitely many primes of the form: a^{2} + b^{4}.(J. Friedlander, H. Iwaniec);
- combinatorial properties of the set of numbers (A.A.Glibichuk):

$$n^* \bmod{m}, 1 \le n \le m^{\varepsilon}.$$

== Lifting of Kloosterman sums ==
Although the Kloosterman sums may not be calculated in general they may be "lifted" to algebraic number fields, which often yields more convenient formulas. Let $\tau$ be a squarefree integer with $\gcd(\tau,m)=1.$ Assume that for any prime factor p of m we have

$$\left(\frac{\tau}{p}\right)=-1.$$

Then for all integers a, b coprime to m we have

$$K(a,b; m) = (-1)^{\Omega(m)} \sum_{\stackrel{v, w \bmod m}{v^2-\tau w^2 \equiv ab\bmod m}} e^{\frac{4\pi i v}{m}}.$$

Here Ω(m) is the number of prime factors of m counting multiplicity. The sum on the right can be reinterpreted as a sum over algebraic integers in the field $\Q(\sqrt{\tau}).$ This formula is due to Yangbo Ye, inspired by Don Zagier and extending the work of Hervé Jacquet and Ye on the relative trace formula for GL(2). Indeed, much more general exponential sums can be lifted.

== Kuznetsov trace formula ==
The Kuznetsov or relative trace formula connects Kloosterman sums at a deep level with the spectral theory of automorphic forms. Originally this could have been stated as follows. Let $g: \R\to \R$ be a sufficiently "well behaved" function. Then one calls identities of the following type Kuznetsov trace formula:

$$\sum_{c\equiv 0 \bmod N} c^{-r} K(m,n,c) g\left(\frac{4\pi \sqrt{mn}}{c}\right) = \text{ Integral transform }\ +\ \text{ Spectral terms}.$$

The integral transform part is some integral transform of g and the spectral part is a sum of Fourier coefficients, taken over spaces of holomorphic and non-holomorphic modular forms twisted with some integral transform of g. The Kuznetsov trace formula was found by Kuznetsov while studying the growth of weight zero automorphic functions. Using estimates on Kloosterman sums he was able to derive estimates for Fourier coefficients of modular forms in cases where Pierre Deligne's proof of the Weil conjectures was not applicable.

It was later translated by Jacquet to a representation theoretic framework. Let G be a reductive group over a number field F and $H\subset G$ be a subgroup. While the usual trace formula studies the harmonic analysis on G, the relative trace formula is a tool for studying the harmonic analysis on the symmetric space G/H. For an overview and numerous applications see the references.

== History ==
Weil's estimate can now be studied in W. M. Schmidt, Equations over finite fields: an elementary approach, 2nd ed. (Kendrick Press, 2004). The underlying ideas here are due to S. Stepanov and draw inspiration from Axel Thue's work in Diophantine approximation.

There are many connections between Kloosterman sums and modular forms. In fact the sums first appeared (minus the name) in a 1912 paper of Henri Poincaré on modular forms. Hans Salié introduced a form of Kloosterman sum that is twisted by a Dirichlet character: Such Salié sums have an elementary evaluation.

After the discovery of important formulae connecting Kloosterman sums with non-holomorphic modular forms by Kuznetsov in 1979, which contained some 'savings on average' over the square root estimate, there were further developments by Iwaniec and Deshouillers in a seminal paper in Inventiones Mathematicae (1982). Subsequent applications to analytic number theory were worked out by a number of authors, particularly Bombieri, Fouvry, Friedlander and Iwaniec.

The field remains somewhat inaccessible. A detailed introduction to the spectral theory needed to understand the Kuznetsov formulae is given in R. C. Baker, Kloosterman Sums and Maass Forms, vol. I (Kendrick press, 2003). Also relevant for students and researchers interested in the field is Iwaniec & Kowalski (2004).

Yitang Zhang used Kloosterman sums in his proof of bounded gaps between primes.

== See also ==
- Hasse's bound
