= Ramanujan's sum =

Function in number theory given by Srinivasa Ramanujan

In number theory, Ramanujan's sum, usually denoted c_{q}(n), is a function of two positive integer variables q and n defined by the formula

$$c_q(n) = \sum_{1 \le a \leq q \atop (a,q)=1} e^{2 \pi i \tfrac{a}{q} n},$$

where (a, q) = 1 means that a only takes on values coprime to q.

Srinivasa Ramanujan mentioned the sums in a 1918 paper. In addition to the expansions discussed in this article, Ramanujan's sums are used in the proof of Vinogradov's theorem that every sufficiently large odd number is the sum of three primes.

c_{q}(n) is always an integer.

== Notation ==
- For integers a and b, $a\mid b$ is read "a divides b" and means that there exists an integer c such that $a c = b$; $\frac b a = c.$ Similarly, $a\nmid b$ is read "a does not divide b".
  - The summation symbol $\sum_{d\,\mid\,m}f(d)$ means that d goes through all the positive divisors of m, e.g. $\sum_{d\,\mid\,12}f(d) = f(1) + f(2) + f(3) + f(4) + f(6) + f(12).$
- $(a,\,b)$ is the greatest common divisor.
- $\phi(n)$ is Euler's totient function.
- $\mu(n)$ is the Möbius function.
- $\zeta(s)$ is the Riemann zeta function.

== Formulas for c_{q}(n) ==
=== Trigonometry ===
The following formulas come from the definition, Euler's formula $e^{ix}= \cos x + i \sin x,$ and elementary trigonometric identities:

$$\begin{align}
c_1(n) &= 1 \\
c_2(n) &= \cos n\pi \\
c_3(n) &= 2\cos \tfrac23 n\pi \\
c_4(n) &= 2\cos \tfrac12 n\pi \\
c_5(n) &= 2\cos \tfrac25 n\pi + 2\cos \tfrac45 n\pi \\
c_6(n) &= 2\cos \tfrac13 n\pi \\
c_7(n) &= 2\cos \tfrac27 n\pi + 2\cos \tfrac47 n\pi + 2\cos \tfrac67 n\pi \\
c_8(n) &= 2\cos \tfrac14 n\pi + 2\cos \tfrac34 n\pi \\
c_9(n) &= 2\cos \tfrac29 n\pi + 2\cos \tfrac49 n\pi + 2\cos \tfrac89 n\pi \\
c_{10}(n)&= 2\cos \tfrac15 n\pi + 2\cos \tfrac35 n\pi \\
\end{align}$$

and so on (OEIS: A000012, OEIS: A033999, OEIS: A099837, OEIS: A176742,.., OEIS: A100051,...).

=== Kluyver ===
Let $\zeta_q=e^{\frac{2\pi i}{q}}.$ Then ζ_{q} is a root of the equation x^{q} − 1 = 0. Each of its powers,

$$\zeta_q, \zeta_q^2, \ldots, \zeta_q^{q-1}, \zeta_q^q = \zeta_q^0 =1$$

is also a root. Therefore, since there are q of them, they are all of the roots. The numbers $\zeta_q^n$ where 1 ≤ n ≤ q are called the q-th roots of unity. ζ_{q} is called a primitive q-th root of unity because the smallest value of n that makes $\zeta_q^n =1$ is q. The other primitive q-th roots of unity are the numbers $\zeta_q^a$ where (a, q) = 1. Therefore, there are φ(q) primitive q-th roots of unity.

Thus, the Ramanujan sum c_{q}(n) is the sum of the n-th powers of the primitive q-th roots of unity.

It is a fact that the powers of ζ_{q} are precisely the primitive roots for all the divisors of q.

Example. Let q = 12. Then

$\zeta_{12}, \zeta_{12}^5, \zeta_{12}^7,$ and $\zeta_{12}^{11}$ are the primitive twelfth roots of unity,

$\zeta_{12}^2$ and $\zeta_{12}^{10}$ are the primitive sixth roots of unity,

$\zeta_{12}^3 = i$ and $\zeta_{12}^9 = -i$ are the primitive fourth roots of unity,

$\zeta_{12}^4$ and $\zeta_{12}^8$ are the primitive third roots of unity,

$\zeta_{12}^6 = -1$ is the primitive second root of unity, and

$\zeta_{12}^{12} = 1$ is the primitive first root of unity.

Therefore, if

$$\eta_q(n) = \sum_{k=1}^q \zeta_q^{kn}$$

is the sum of the n-th powers of all the roots, primitive and imprimitive,

$$\eta_q(n) = \sum_{d\mid q} c_d(n),$$

and by Möbius inversion,

$$c_q(n) = \sum_{d\mid q} \mu\left(\frac{q}d\right)\eta_d(n).$$

It follows from the identity x^{q} − 1 = (x − 1)(x^{q−1} + x^{q−2} + ... + x + 1) that

$$\eta_q(n) = \begin{cases} 0 & q\nmid n\\ q & q\mid n\\ \end{cases}$$

and this leads to the formula

$$c_q(n)=\sum_{d\mid (q,n)} \mu\left(\frac{q}{d}\right) d,$$

published by Kluyver in 1906.

This shows that c_{q}(n) is always an integer. Compare it with the formula

$$\phi(q)=\sum_{d \mid q}\mu\left(\frac{q}{d}\right) d.$$

=== von Sterneck ===
It is easily shown from the definition that c_{q}(n) is multiplicative when considered as a function of q for a fixed value of n: i.e.

$$\mbox{If } \;(q,r) = 1 \;\mbox{ then }\; c_q(n)c_r(n)=c_{qr}(n).$$

From the definition (or Kluyver's formula) it is straightforward to prove that, if p is a prime number,

$$c_p(n) =
\begin{cases}
-1     &\mbox{  if }p\nmid n\\
\phi(p)&\mbox{  if }p\mid n\\
\end{cases}
,$$

and if p^{k} is a prime power where k > 1,

$$c_{p^k}(n) =
\begin{cases}
0         &\mbox{  if }p^{k-1}\nmid n\\
-p^{k-1}  &\mbox{  if }p^{k-1}\mid n \mbox{ and }p^k\nmid n\\
\phi(p^k) &\mbox{  if }p^k\mid n\\
\end{cases}
.$$

This result and the multiplicative property can be used to prove

$$c_q(n)= \mu\left(\frac{q}{(q, n)}\right)\frac{\phi(q)}{\phi\left(\frac{q}{(q, n)}\right)}.$$

This is called von Sterneck's arithmetic function. The equivalence of it and Ramanujan's sum is due to Hölder.

=== Other properties of c_{q}(n) ===
For all positive integers q,

$$\begin{align}
c_1(q) &= 1 \\
c_q(1) &= \mu(q)  \\
c_q(q) &= \phi(q) \\
c_q(m) &= c_q(n) && \text{for } m \equiv n \pmod q \\
\end{align}$$

For a fixed value of q the absolute value of the sequence $\{c_q(1), c_q(2), \ldots\}$ is bounded by φ(q), and for a fixed value of n the absolute value of the sequence $\{c_1(n), c_2(n), \ldots\}$ is bounded by n.

If q > 1

$$\sum_{n=a}^{a+q-1} c_q(n)=0.$$

Let m_{1}, m_{2} > 0, m = lcm(m_{1}, m_{2}). Then Ramanujan's sums satisfy an orthogonality property:

$$\frac{1}{m}\sum_{k=1}^m c_{m_1}(k) c_{m_2}(k) = \begin{cases} \phi(m) & m_1=m_2=m,\\ 0 & \text{otherwise} \end{cases}$$

Let n, k > 0. Then

$$\sum_\stackrel{d\mid n}{\gcd(d,k)=1} d\;\frac{\mu(\tfrac{n}{d})}{\phi(d)} =\frac{\mu(n) c_n(k)}{\phi(n)},$$

known as the Brauer–Rademacher identity.

If n > 0 and a is any integer, we also have

$$\sum_\stackrel{1\le k\le n}{\gcd(k,n)=1} c_n(k-a) = \mu(n)c_n(a),$$

due to Cohen.

== Table ==
Ramanujan sum c_{s}(n)
		n																													
		1	2	3	4	5	6	7	8	9	10	11	12	13	14	15	16	17	18	19	20	21	22	23	24	25	26	27	28	29	30
s	1	1	1	1	1	1	1	1	1	1	1	1	1	1	1	1	1	1	1	1	1	1	1	1	1	1	1	1	1	1	1
s	2	−1	1	−1	1	−1	1	−1	1	−1	1	−1	1	−1	1	−1	1	−1	1	−1	1	−1	1	−1	1	−1	1	−1	1	−1	1
s	3	−1	−1	2	−1	−1	2	−1	−1	2	−1	−1	2	−1	−1	2	−1	−1	2	−1	−1	2	−1	−1	2	−1	−1	2	−1	−1	2
s	4	0	−2	0	2	0	−2	0	2	0	−2	0	2	0	−2	0	2	0	−2	0	2	0	−2	0	2	0	−2	0	2	0	−2
s	5	−1	−1	−1	−1	4	−1	−1	−1	−1	4	−1	−1	−1	−1	4	−1	−1	−1	−1	4	−1	−1	−1	−1	4	−1	−1	−1	−1	4
s	6	1	−1	−2	−1	1	2	1	−1	−2	−1	1	2	1	−1	−2	−1	1	2	1	−1	−2	−1	1	2	1	−1	−2	−1	1	2
s	7	−1	−1	−1	−1	−1	−1	6	−1	−1	−1	−1	−1	−1	6	−1	−1	−1	−1	−1	−1	6	−1	−1	−1	−1	−1	−1	6	−1	−1
s	8	0	0	0	−4	0	0	0	4	0	0	0	−4	0	0	0	4	0	0	0	−4	0	0	0	4	0	0	0	−4	0	0
s	9	0	0	−3	0	0	−3	0	0	6	0	0	−3	0	0	−3	0	0	6	0	0	−3	0	0	−3	0	0	6	0	0	−3
s	10	1	−1	1	−1	−4	−1	1	−1	1	4	1	−1	1	−1	−4	−1	1	−1	1	4	1	−1	1	−1	−4	−1	1	−1	1	4
s	11	−1	−1	−1	−1	−1	−1	−1	−1	−1	−1	10	−1	−1	−1	−1	−1	−1	−1	−1	−1	−1	10	−1	−1	−1	−1	−1	−1	−1	−1
s	12	0	2	0	−2	0	−4	0	−2	0	2	0	4	0	2	0	−2	0	−4	0	−2	0	2	0	4	0	2	0	−2	0	−4
s	13	−1	−1	−1	−1	−1	−1	−1	−1	−1	−1	−1	−1	12	−1	−1	−1	−1	−1	−1	−1	−1	−1	−1	−1	−1	12	−1	−1	−1	−1
s	14	1	−1	1	−1	1	−1	−6	−1	1	−1	1	−1	1	6	1	−1	1	−1	1	−1	−6	−1	1	−1	1	−1	1	6	1	−1
s	15	1	1	−2	1	−4	−2	1	1	−2	−4	1	−2	1	1	8	1	1	−2	1	−4	−2	1	1	−2	−4	1	−2	1	1	8
s	16	0	0	0	0	0	0	0	−8	0	0	0	0	0	0	0	8	0	0	0	0	0	0	0	−8	0	0	0	0	0	0
s	17	−1	−1	−1	−1	−1	−1	−1	−1	−1	−1	−1	−1	−1	−1	−1	−1	16	−1	−1	−1	−1	−1	−1	−1	−1	−1	−1	−1	−1	−1
s	18	0	0	3	0	0	−3	0	0	−6	0	0	−3	0	0	3	0	0	6	0	0	3	0	0	−3	0	0	−6	0	0	−3
s	19	−1	−1	−1	−1	−1	−1	−1	−1	−1	−1	−1	−1	−1	−1	−1	−1	−1	−1	18	−1	−1	−1	−1	−1	−1	−1	−1	−1	−1	−1
s	20	0	2	0	−2	0	2	0	−2	0	−8	0	−2	0	2	0	−2	0	2	0	8	0	2	0	−2	0	2	0	−2	0	−8
s	21	1	1	−2	1	1	−2	−6	1	−2	1	1	−2	1	−6	−2	1	1	−2	1	1	12	1	1	−2	1	1	−2	−6	1	−2
s	22	1	−1	1	−1	1	−1	1	−1	1	−1	−10	−1	1	−1	1	−1	1	−1	1	−1	1	10	1	−1	1	−1	1	−1	1	−1
s	23	−1	−1	−1	−1	−1	−1	−1	−1	−1	−1	−1	−1	−1	−1	−1	−1	−1	−1	−1	−1	−1	−1	22	−1	−1	−1	−1	−1	−1	−1
s	24	0	0	0	4	0	0	0	−4	0	0	0	−8	0	0	0	−4	0	0	0	4	0	0	0	8	0	0	0	4	0	0
s	25	0	0	0	0	−5	0	0	0	0	−5	0	0	0	0	−5	0	0	0	0	−5	0	0	0	0	20	0	0	0	0	−5
s	26	1	−1	1	−1	1	−1	1	−1	1	−1	1	−1	−12	−1	1	−1	1	−1	1	−1	1	−1	1	−1	1	12	1	−1	1	−1
s	27	0	0	0	0	0	0	0	0	−9	0	0	0	0	0	0	0	0	−9	0	0	0	0	0	0	0	0	18	0	0	0
s	28	0	2	0	−2	0	2	0	−2	0	2	0	−2	0	−12	0	−2	0	2	0	−2	0	2	0	−2	0	2	0	12	0	2
s	29	−1	−1	−1	−1	−1	−1	−1	−1	−1	−1	−1	−1	−1	−1	−1	−1	−1	−1	−1	−1	−1	−1	−1	−1	−1	−1	−1	−1	28	−1
s	30	−1	1	2	1	4	−2	−1	1	2	−4	−1	−2	−1	1	−8	1	−1	−2	−1	−4	2	1	−1	−2	4	1	2	1	−1	8

== Ramanujan expansions ==
If f (n) is an arithmetic function (i.e. a complex-valued function of the integers or natural numbers), then a convergent infinite series of the form:

$$f(n)=\sum_{q=1}^\infty a_q c_q(n)$$

or of the form:

$$f(q)=\sum_{n=1}^\infty a_n c_q(n)$$

where the a_{k} ∈ C, is called a Ramanujan expansion of f (n).

Ramanujan found expansions of some of the well-known functions of number theory. All of these results are proved in an "elementary" manner (i.e. only using formal manipulations of series and the simplest results about convergence).

The expansion of the zero function depends on a result from the analytic theory of prime numbers, namely that the series

$$\sum_{n=1}^\infty\frac{\mu(n)}{n}$$

converges to 0, and the results for r(n) and r′(n) depend on theorems in an earlier paper.

All the formulas in this section are from Ramanujan's 1918 paper.

=== Generating functions ===
The generating functions of the Ramanujan sums are Dirichlet series:

$$\zeta(s) \sum_{\delta\,\mid\,q} \mu\left(\frac{q}{\delta}\right) \delta^{1-s} = \sum_{n=1}^\infty \frac{c_q(n)}{n^s}$$

is a generating function for the sequence c_{q}(1), c_{q}(2), ... where q is kept constant, and

$$\frac{\sigma_{r-1}(n)}{n^{r-1}\zeta(r)}= \sum_{q=1}^\infty \frac{c_q(n)}{q^{r}}$$

is a generating function for the sequence c_{1}(n), c_{2}(n), ... where n is kept constant.

There is also the double Dirichlet series

$$\frac{\zeta(s) \zeta(r+s-1)}{\zeta(r)}= \sum_{q=1}^\infty \sum_{n=1}^\infty \frac{c_q(n)}{q^r n^s}.$$

The polynomial with Ramanujan sum's as coefficients can be expressed with cyclotomic polynomial

$$\sum_{n=1}^q c_q(n) x^{n-1} = (x^q - 1) \frac{\Phi_q'(x)}{\Phi_q(x)} = \Phi_q'(x) \prod_{\begin{array}{c} d \mid q \\[-4pt] d \neq q\end{array}} \Phi_d(x)$$

=== σ_{k}(n) ===
σ_{k}(n) is the divisor function (i.e. the sum of the k-th powers of the divisors of n, including 1 and n). σ_{0}(n), the number of divisors of n, is usually written d(n) and σ_{1}(n), the sum of the divisors of n, is usually written σ(n).

If s > 0,

$$\begin{align}
\sigma_s(n) &= n^s \zeta(s+1) \left(\frac{c_1(n)}{1^{s+1}}+ \frac{c_2(n)}{2^{s+1}}+ \frac{c_3(n)}{3^{s+1}}+\cdots\right) \\
\sigma_{-s}(n) &=\zeta(s+1)\left(\frac{c_1(n)}{1^{s+1}}+\frac{c_2(n)}{2^{s+1}}+\frac{c_3(n)}{3^{s+1}}+\cdots\right)
\end{align}$$

Setting s = 1 gives

$$\sigma(n)= \frac{\pi^2}{6}n \left(\frac{c_1(n)}{1}+ \frac{c_2(n)}{4}+ \frac{c_3(n)}{9}+ \cdots \right).$$

If the Riemann hypothesis is true, and $-\tfrac12<s<\tfrac12,$

$$\sigma_s(n) = \zeta(1-s) \left(\frac{c_1(n)}{1^{1-s}}+ \frac{c_2(n)}{2^{1-s}}+ \frac{c_3(n)}{3^{1-s}}+ \cdots \right) = n^s \zeta(1+s) \left( \frac{c_1(n)}{1^{1+s}}+ \frac{c_2(n)}{2^{1+s}}+ \frac{c_3(n)}{3^{1+s}}+ \cdots \right).$$

=== d(n) ===
d(n) = σ_{0}(n) is the number of divisors of n, including 1 and n itself.

$$\begin{align}
-d(n) &= \frac{\log 1}{1}c_1(n)+ \frac{\log 2}{2}c_2(n)+ \frac{\log 3}{3}c_3(n)+ \cdots \\
-d(n)(2\gamma+\log n) &= \frac{\log^2 1}{1}c_1(n)+ \frac{\log^2 2}{2}c_2(n)+ \frac{\log^2 3}{3}c_3(n)+ \cdots
\end{align}$$

where γ = 0.5772... is the Euler–Mascheroni constant.

=== φ(n) ===
Euler's totient function φ(n) is the number of positive integers less than n and coprime to n. Ramanujan defines a generalization of it, if

$$n=p_1^{a_1}p_2^{a_2}p_3^{a_3}\cdots$$

is the prime factorization of n, and s is a complex number, let

$$\varphi_s(n)=n^s(1-p_1^{-s})(1-p_2^{-s})(1-p_3^{-s})\cdots,$$

so that φ_{1}(n) = φ(n) is Euler's function.

He proves that

$$\frac{\mu(n)n^s}{\varphi_s(n)\zeta(s)}= \sum_{\nu=1}^\infty \frac{\mu(n\nu)}{\nu^s}$$

and uses this to show that

$$\frac{\varphi_s(n)\zeta(s+1)}{n^s}=\frac{\mu(1)c_1(n)}{\varphi_{s+1}(1)}+\frac{\mu(2)c_2(n)}{\varphi_{s+1}(2)}+\frac{\mu(3)c_3(n)}{\varphi_{s+1}(3)}+\cdots.$$

Letting s = 1,

$$\varphi(n) = \frac{6}{\pi^2}n \left(c_1(n) -\frac{c_2(n)}{2^2-1} -\frac{c_3(n)}{3^2-1} -\frac{c_5(n)}{5^2-1}+\frac{c_6(n)}{(2^2-1)(3^2-1)} - \frac{c_7(n)}{7^2-1} +\frac{c_{10}(n)}{(2^2-1)(5^2-1)} -\cdots \right).$$

Note that the constant is the inverse of the one in the formula for σ(n).

=== Λ(n) ===
Von Mangoldt's function Λ(n) = 0 unless n = p^{k} is a power of a prime number, in which case it is the natural logarithm log p. For m > 1

$$-\Lambda(m) = c_m(1)+ \frac{1}{2} c_m(2)+ \frac13c_m(3)+\cdots$$

=== Zero ===
For all n > 0,

$$0= c_1(n)+ \frac12c_2(n)+ \frac13c_3(n)+ \cdots.$$

This is equivalent to the prime number theorem.

=== r_{2s}(n) (sums of squares) ===
r_{2s}(n) is the number of ways of representing n as the sum of 2s squares, counting different orders and signs as different (e.g., r_{2}(13) = 8, as 13 = (±2)^{2} + (±3)^{2} = (±3)^{2} + (±2)^{2}.)

Ramanujan defines a function δ_{2s}(n) and references a paper in which he proved that r_{2s}(n) = δ_{2s}(n) for s = 1, 2, 3, and 4. For s > 4 he shows that δ_{2s}(n) is a good approximation to r_{2s}(n).

s = 1 has a special formula:

$$\delta_2(n)= \pi \left(\frac{c_1(n)}{1}- \frac{c_3(n)}{3}+ \frac{c_5(n)}{5}- \cdots \right).$$

In the following formulas the signs repeat with a period of 4.

$$\begin{align}
\delta_{2s}(n) &= \frac{\pi^s n^{s-1}}{(s-1)!} \left( \frac{c_1(n)}{1^s}+ \frac{c_4(n)}{2^s}+ \frac{c_3(n)}{3^s}+\frac{c_8(n)}{4^s}+ \frac{c_5(n)}{5^s}+ \frac{c_{12}(n)}{6^s}+ \frac{c_7(n)}{7^s}+ \frac{c_{16}(n)}{8^s}+ \cdots \right) && s \equiv 0 \pmod 4 \\[6pt]
\delta_{2s}(n) &= \frac{\pi^s n^{s-1}}{(s-1)!} \left( \frac{c_1(n)}{1^s}- \frac{c_4(n)}{2^s}+ \frac{c_3(n)}{3^s}- \frac{c_8(n)}{4^s}+ \frac{c_5(n)}{5^s}- \frac{c_{12}(n)}{6^s}+ \frac{c_7(n)}{7^s}- \frac{c_{16}(n)}{8^s}+ \cdots \right) && s \equiv 2 \pmod 4 \\[6pt]
\delta_{2s}(n) &= \frac{\pi^s n^{s-1}}{(s-1)!} \left( \frac{c_1(n)}{1^s}+ \frac{c_4(n)}{2^s}- \frac{c_3(n)}{3^s}+ \frac{c_8(n)}{4^s}+ \frac{c_5(n)}{5^s}+ \frac{c_{12}(n)}{6^s}- \frac{c_7(n)}{7^s}+ \frac{c_{16}(n)}{8^s}+ \cdots \right) && s \equiv 1 \pmod 4 \text{ and } s > 1 \\[6pt]
\delta_{2s}(n) &= \frac{\pi^s n^{s-1}}{(s-1)!} \left(\frac{c_1(n)}{1^s}- \frac{c_4(n)}{2^s}- \frac{c_3(n)}{3^s}- \frac{c_8(n)}{4^s}+ \frac{c_5(n)}{5^s}-\frac{c_{12}(n)}{6^s}-\frac{c_7(n)}{7^s}-\frac{c_{16}(n)}{8^s}+ \cdots \right) &&  s \equiv 3 \pmod 4 \\
\end{align}$$

and therefore,

$$\begin{align}
r_2(n) &= \pi \left(\frac{c_1(n)}{1}- \frac{c_3(n)}{3}+ \frac{c_5(n)}{5}- \frac{c_7(n)}{7}+ \frac{c_{11}(n)}{11}-\frac{c_{13}(n)}{13}+ \frac{c_{15}(n)}{15} - \frac{c_{17}(n)}{17} + \cdots \right) \\[6pt]
r_4(n) &= \pi^2 n \left( \frac{c_1(n)}{1}- \frac{c_4(n)}{4}+ \frac{c_3(n)}{9}- \frac{c_8(n)}{16}+ \frac{c_5(n)}{25}- \frac{c_{12}(n)}{36}+ \frac{c_7(n)}{49}- \frac{c_{16}(n)}{64}+ \cdots \right) \\[6pt]
r_6(n) &= \frac{\pi^3 n^2}{2} \left( \frac{c_1(n)}{1}- \frac{c_4(n)}{8}- \frac{c_3(n)}{27}- \frac{c_8(n)}{64}+ \frac{c_5(n)}{125}- \frac{c_{12}(n)}{216}- \frac{c_7(n)}{343} - \frac{c_{16}(n)}{512}+ \cdots \right) \\[6pt]
r_8(n) &= \frac{\pi^4 n^3}{6} \left(\frac{c_1(n)}{1}+ \frac{c_4(n)}{16}+  \frac{c_3(n)}{81}+  \frac{c_8(n)}{256}+ \frac{c_5(n)}{625}+ \frac{c_{12}(n)}{1296}+ \frac{c_7(n)}{2401}+ \frac{c_{16}(n)}{4096}+ \cdots \right)
\end{align}$$

=== r′_{2s}(n) (sums of triangles) ===
$r'_{2s}(n)$ is the number of ways n can be represented as the sum of 2s triangular numbers (i.e. the numbers 1, 3 = 1 + 2, 6 = 1 + 2 + 3, 10 = 1 + 2 + 3 + 4, 15, ...; the n-th triangular number is given by the formula n(n + 1)/2.)

The analysis here is similar to that for squares. Ramanujan refers to the same paper as he did for the squares, where he showed that there is a function $\delta'_{2s}(n)$ such that $r'_{2s}(n) = \delta'_{2s}(n)$ for s = 1, 2, 3, and 4, and that for s > 4, $\delta'_{2s}(n)$ is a good approximation to $r'_{2s}(n).$

Again, s = 1 requires a special formula:

$$\delta'_2(n)= \frac{\pi}{4} \left(\frac{c_1(4n+1)}{1}-\frac{c_3(4n+1)}{3}+ \frac{c_5(4n+1)}{5}- \frac{c_7(4n+1)}{7}+ \cdots \right).$$

If s is a multiple of 4,

$$\begin{align}
\delta'_{2s}(n) &= \frac{(\frac{\pi}{2})^s}{(s-1)!}\left(n+\frac{s}4\right)^{s-1} \left( \frac{c_1(n+\frac{s}4)}{1^s}+ \frac{c_3(n+\frac{s}4)}{3^s}+ \frac{c_5(n+\frac{s}4)}{5^s}+ \cdots \right) && s \equiv 0 \pmod 4 \\[6pt]
\delta'_{2s}(n) &= \frac{(\frac{\pi}{2})^s}{(s-1)!}\left(n+\frac{s}4\right)^{s-1} \left( \frac{c_1(2n+\frac{s}2)}{1^s}+ \frac{c_3(2n+\frac{s}2)}{3^s}+ \frac{c_5(2n+\frac{s}2)}{5^s}+ \cdots \right) && s \equiv 2 \pmod 4 \\[6pt]
\delta'_{2s}(n) &= \frac{(\frac{\pi}{2})^s}{(s-1)!}\left(n+\frac{s}4\right)^{s-1} \left(\frac{c_1(4n+s)}{1^s}- \frac{c_3(4n+s)}{3^s}+\frac{c_5(4n+s)}{5^s}- \cdots \right) && s \equiv 1 \pmod 2 \text{ and } s >1
\end{align}$$

Therefore,

$$\begin{align}
r'_2(n) &= \frac{\pi}{4} \left(\frac{c_1(4n+1)}{1}- \frac{c_3(4n+1)}{3}+ \frac{c_5(4n+1)}{5}- \frac{c_7(4n+1)}{7}+ \cdots \right) \\[6pt]
r'_4(n) &= \left(\frac{\pi}{2}\right)^2\left(n+\frac12\right) \left(\frac{c_1(2n+1)}{1}+\frac{c_3(2n+1)}{9}+ \frac{c_5(2n+1)}{25}+ \cdots \right) \\[6pt]
r'_6(n) &= \frac{(\frac{\pi}{2})^3}{2}\left(n+\frac34\right)^2 \left(\frac{c_1(4n+3)}{1}-\frac{c_3(4n+3)}{27}+ \frac{c_5(4n+3)}{125}-\cdots \right)\\[6pt]
r'_8(n) &= \frac{(\frac{\pi}{2})^4}{6}(n+1)^3 \left(\frac{c_1(n+1)}{1}+ \frac{c_3(n+1)}{81}+ \frac{c_5(n+1)}{625}+ \cdots \right)
\end{align}$$

=== Sums ===
Let

$$\begin{align}
T_q(n) &=  c_q(1) + c_q(2) + \cdots + c_q(n) \\
U_q(n) &=  T_q(n) +  \tfrac12\phi(q)
\end{align}$$

Then for s > 1,

$$\begin{align}
\sigma_{-s}(1) + \cdots + \sigma_{-s}(n) &= \zeta(s+1) \left(n+ \frac{T_2(n)}{2^{s+1}}+ \frac{T_3(n)}{3^{s+1}}+\frac{T_4(n)}{4^{s+1}} +\cdots \right) \\
&= \zeta(s+1) \left(n+\tfrac12+ \frac{U_2(n)}{2^{s+1}}+ \frac{U_3(n)}{3^{s+1}}+ \frac{U_4(n)}{4^{s+1}} +\cdots \right)- \tfrac12\zeta(s) \\
d(1)+ \cdots+ d(n) &= - \frac{T_2(n)\log2}{2} - \frac{T_3(n)\log3}{3} - \frac{T_4(n)\log4}{4} - \cdots \\
d(1)\log 1 + \cdots + d(n)\log n &= -\frac{T_2(n)(2\gamma\log2-\log^22)}{2} -\frac{T_3(n)(2\gamma\log3-\log^23)}{3} -\frac{T_4(n)(2\gamma\log4-\log^24)}{4} -\cdots \\
r_2(1)+ \cdots+ r_2(n) &= \pi \left(n -\frac{T_3(n)}{3} +\frac{T_5(n)}{5} -\frac{T_7(n)}{7} +\cdots \right)
\end{align}$$

== See also ==
- Gaussian period
- Kloosterman sum
