= Nikolay Korobov =

Soviet mathematician (1917–2004)

Nikolai Mikhailovich Korobov
- Born: 23 November 1917; Moscow, Russian SFSR
- Died: 25 October 2004 (aged 86); Moscow, Russia
- Education: Moscow State University
- Known for: Number theory
- Scientific career
- Fields: Mathematics
- Doctoral advisor: Aleksandr Osipovich Gelfond
- Doctoral students: Anatoly Karatsuba

Nikolai Mikhailovich Korobov (Russian: Коробов Николай Михайлович; November 23, 1917 – October 25, 2004) was a Soviet mathematician specializing in number theory and numerical analysis. He is best known for his work in analytic number theory, especially in exponential and trigonometric sums.
