= ATS theorem =

In mathematics, the ATS theorem is the theorem on the approximation of a trigonometric sum by a shorter one. The application of the ATS theorem in certain problems of mathematical and theoretical physics can be very helpful.

== History of the problem ==
In some fields of mathematics and mathematical physics, sums of the form

$$S = \sum_{a<k\le b} \varphi(k)e^{2\pi i f(k)}  \qquad (1)$$

are under study.

Here $\varphi(x)$ and $f(x)$ are real valued functions of a real argument, and $i^2= -1.$ Such sums appear, for example, in number theory in the analysis of the Riemann zeta function, in the solution of problems connected with integer points in the domains on plane and in space, in the study of the Fourier series, and in the solution of such differential equations as the wave equation, the potential equation, the heat conductivity equation.

The problem of approximation of the series (1) by a suitable function was studied already by Euler and Poisson.

We shall define the length of the sum $S$ to be the number $b-a$ (for the integers $a$ and $b,$ this is the number of the summands in $S$).

Under certain conditions on $\varphi(x)$ and $f(x)$ the sum $S$ can be substituted with good accuracy by another sum $S_1,$

$$S_1 = \sum_{\alpha<k\le \beta} \Phi(k)e^{2\pi i F(k)} ,  \   \   \  (2)$$

where the length $\beta-\alpha$ is far less than $b-a.$

First relations of the form

$$S = S_1 + R , \qquad  (3)$$

where $S ,$ $S_1$ are the sums (1) and (2) respectively, $R$ is a remainder term, with concrete functions $\varphi(x)$ and $f(x),$ were obtained by G. H. Hardy and J. E. Littlewood, when they deduced approximate functional equation for the Riemann zeta function $\zeta(s)$ and by I. M. Vinogradov, in the study of the amounts of integer points in the domains on plane. In general form the theorem was proved by J. Van der Corput, (on the recent results connected with the Van der Corput theorem one can read at).

In every one of the above-mentioned works, some restrictions on the functions $\varphi(x)$ and $f(x)$ were imposed. With convenient (for applications) restrictions on $\varphi(x)$ and $f(x),$ the theorem was proved by A. A. Karatsuba in (see also,).

== Certain notations ==
[1]. For $B > 0, B \to +\infty,$ or $B \to 0,$ the record

$$1 \ll \frac{A}{B} \ll 1$$

means that there are the constants $C_1 > 0$
and $C_2 > 0,$
such that

$$C_1 \leq\frac{|A|}{B} \leq C_2.$$

[2]. For a real number $\alpha,$ the record $\|\alpha\|$ means that

$$\|\alpha\| = \min(\{\alpha\},1- \{\alpha\}),$$

where

$$\{\alpha\}$$

is the fractional part of $\alpha.$

== ATS theorem ==
Let the real functions ƒ(x) and $\varphi(x)$ satisfy on the segment [a, b] the following conditions:

1) $f''''(x)$ and $\varphi''(x)$ are continuous;

2) there exist numbers $H,$ $U$ and $V$ such that

$$H > 0, \qquad  1 \ll U \ll V, \qquad 0 < b-a \leq V$$

and

$$\begin{array}{rc}
\frac{1}{U} \ll f''(x) \ll \frac{1}{U}  \ ,&  \varphi(x) \ll H ,\\  \\
f'''(x) \ll \frac{1}{UV}  \ ,&  \varphi'(x) \ll \frac{H}{V} ,\\  \\
f''''(x) \ll \frac{1}{UV^2}  \ ,&  \varphi''(x) \ll \frac{H}{V^2} . \\  \\
\end{array}$$

Then, if we define the numbers $x_\mu$ from the equation

$$f'(x_\mu) = \mu,$$

we have

$$\sum_{a< \mu\le b} \varphi(\mu)e^{2\pi i f(\mu)} = \sum_{f'(a)\le\mu\le
f'(b)}C(\mu)Z(\mu) + R ,$$

where

$$R = O
\left(\frac{HU}{b-a} + HT_a + HT_b +
H\log\left(f'(b)-f'(a)+2\right)\right);$$

$$T_j =
\begin{cases}
0, & \text{if } f'(j) \text{ is an integer}; \\
\min\left(\frac{1}{\|f'(j)\|}, \sqrt{U}\right), &
\text{if } \|f'(j)\| \ne 0; \\
\end{cases}$$

$j = a,b;$

$$C(\mu) =
\begin{cases}
1, & \text{if } f'(a) < \mu < f'(b) ; \\
\frac{1}{2},& \text{if }
\mu = f'(a)\text{ or }\mu = f'(b) ;\\
\end{cases}$$

$$Z(\mu) = \frac{1+i}{\sqrt2} \frac{\varphi(x_\mu)}{\sqrt{f''(x_\mu)}} e^{2\pi i(f(x_\mu)- \mu x_\mu)} \ .$$

The most simple variant of the formulated theorem is the statement, which is called in the literature the Van der Corput lemma.

== Van der Corput lemma ==
Let $f$ be a real differentiable function in the interval $]a,b],$ moreover, inside of this interval, its derivative $f'$ is a monotonic and a sign-preserving function, and for the constant $\delta$ such that $0 < \delta < 1$ satisfies the inequality $|f'| \leq \delta .$ Then

$$\sum_{a<k\le b} e^{2\pi i f(k)} = \int_a^be^{2\pi i f(x)}dx +
\theta\left(3 + \frac{2\delta}{1-\delta}\right),$$

where $|\theta| \le 1.$

== Remark ==
If the parameters $a$ and $b$ are integers, then it is possible to substitute the last relation by the following ones:

$$\sum_{a<k\le b} e^{2\pi i f(k)} = \int_a^be^{2\pi i f(x)} \, dx + \frac12e^{2\pi i f(b)} - \frac12e^{2\pi i f(a)} + \theta\frac{2\delta}{1-\delta},$$

where $|\theta| \le 1.$

== Additional sources ==
On the applications of ATS to the problems of physics see:

- Karatsuba, Ekatherina A. (2004). "Approximation of sums of oscillating summands in certain physical problems". Journal of Mathematical Physics. 45 (11). AIP Publishing: 4310–4321. doi:10.1063/1.1797552. ISSN 0022-2488.
- Karatsuba, Ekatherina A. (2007-07-20). "On an approach to the study of the Jaynes–Cummings sum in quantum optics". Numerical Algorithms. 45 (1–4). Springer Science and Business Media LLC: 127–137. doi:10.1007/s11075-007-9070-x. ISSN 1017-1398. S2CID 13485016.
- Chassande-Mottin, Éric; Pai, Archana (2006-02-27). "Best chirplet chain: Near-optimal detection of gravitational wave chirps". Physical Review D. 73 (4) 042003. American Physical Society (APS). arXiv:gr-qc/0512137. doi:10.1103/physrevd.73.042003. hdl:11858/00-001M-0000-0013-4BBD-B. ISSN 1550-7998. S2CID 56344234.
- Fleischhauer, M.; Schleich, W. P. (1993-05-01). "Revivals made simple: Poisson summation formula as a key to the revivals in the Jaynes-Cummings model". Physical Review A. 47 (5). American Physical Society (APS): 4258–4269. doi:10.1103/physreva.47.4258. ISSN 1050-2947. PMID 9909432.
