= Rottevalle =

Rottevalle De Rottefalle
- Village
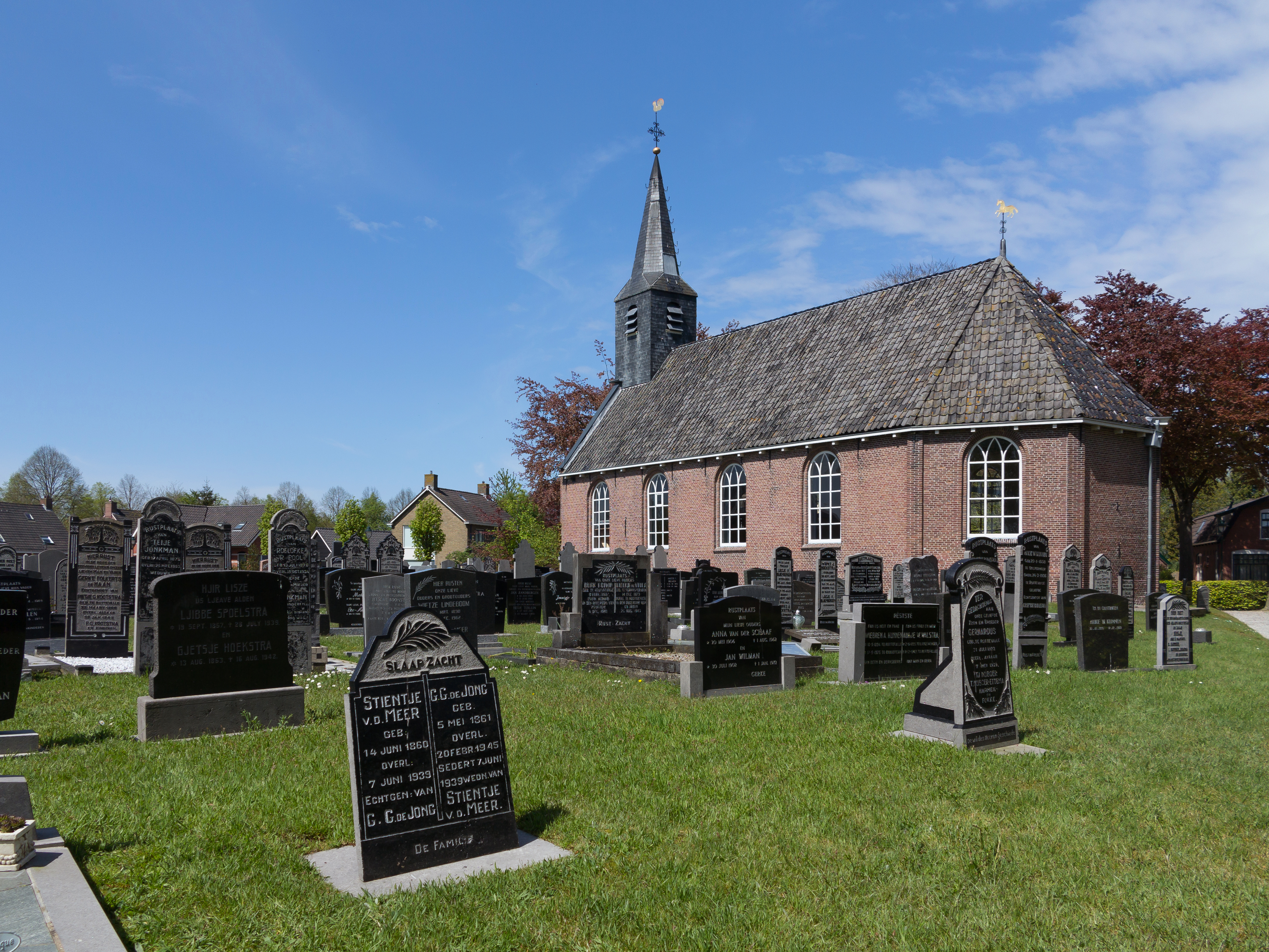
- Rottevalle, reformed church

- Flag Coat of arms

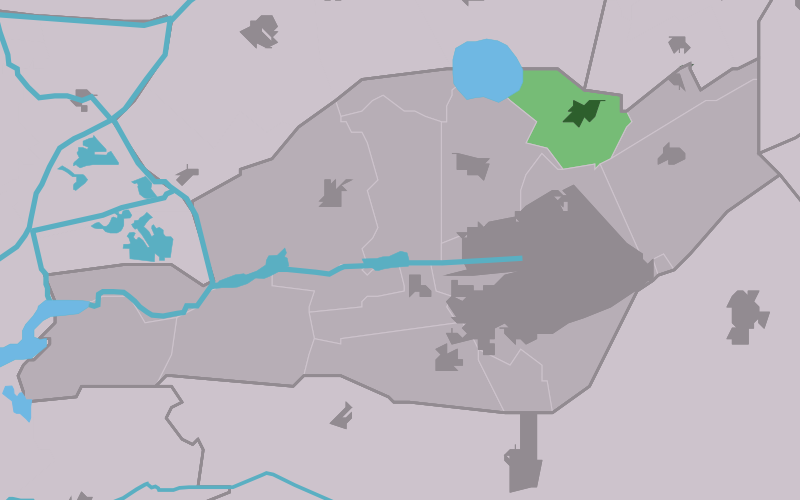
- Location in Smallingerland municipality

- Location in the Netherlands Rottevalle (Netherlands)
- Country: Netherlands
- Province: Friesland
- Municipality: Smallingerland

Area
  - Total: 6.43 km^{2} (2.48 sq mi)
- Elevation: 2.9 m (9.5 ft)

Population (2021)
  - Total: 1,405
  - Density: 219/km^{2} (566/sq mi)
- Time zone: UTC+1 (CET)
  - Summer (DST): UTC+2 (CEST)
- Postal code: 9221
- Dialing code: 0512
- Website: Official

Rottevalle (West Frisian: De Rottefalle) is a village in Smallingerland municipality in the province of Friesland, the Netherlands. It had a population of around 1,363 in January 2017.

== History ==
The village was first mentioned in 1622 as "de Rottevalle", and literally means "the rat trap", but has been named after a type of lock which resembles a rat trap. Rottevalle developed 1650 when the canal De Lits was dug for the excavation of peat. The initial settlement consisted of an inn with several houses. The village was originally part of the grietenij (predecessor of a municipality) Achtkarspelen. The Dutch Reformed church was built in 1724.

Rottevalle was home to 1,050 people in 1840. In 1943, the border was redrawn and Rottevalle became part of Smallingerland. In 1958, part of the De Lits was filled up inside the village.

== Notable people ==
- Baukje de Boer-Veenstra (born 1881), speed skater
- Hendrik Kloosterman (1900–1968), mathematician
- Joop Boomsma (1945–2018), author and playwright

== Gallery ==
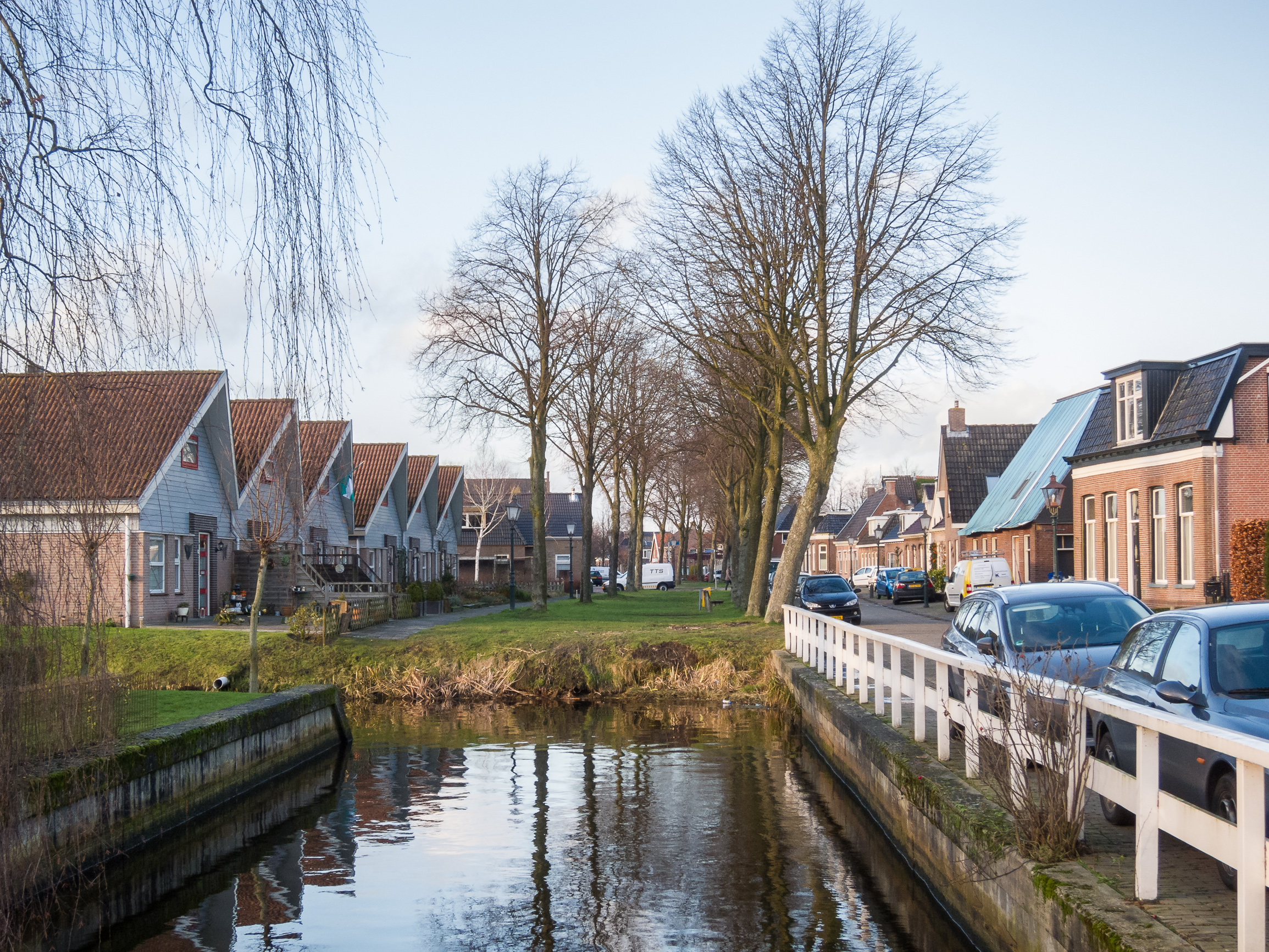
Street/canal view

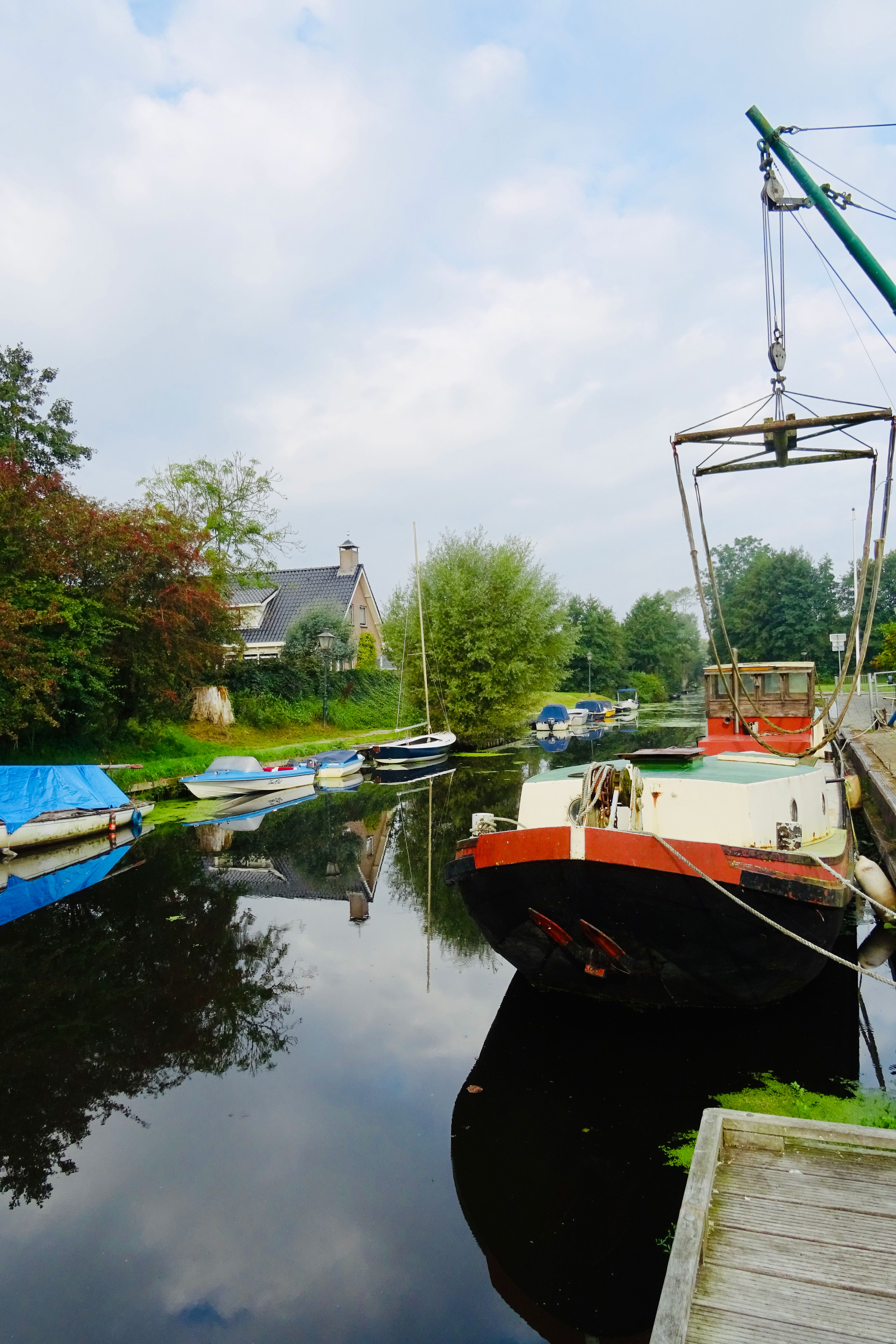
The harbour of Rottevalle

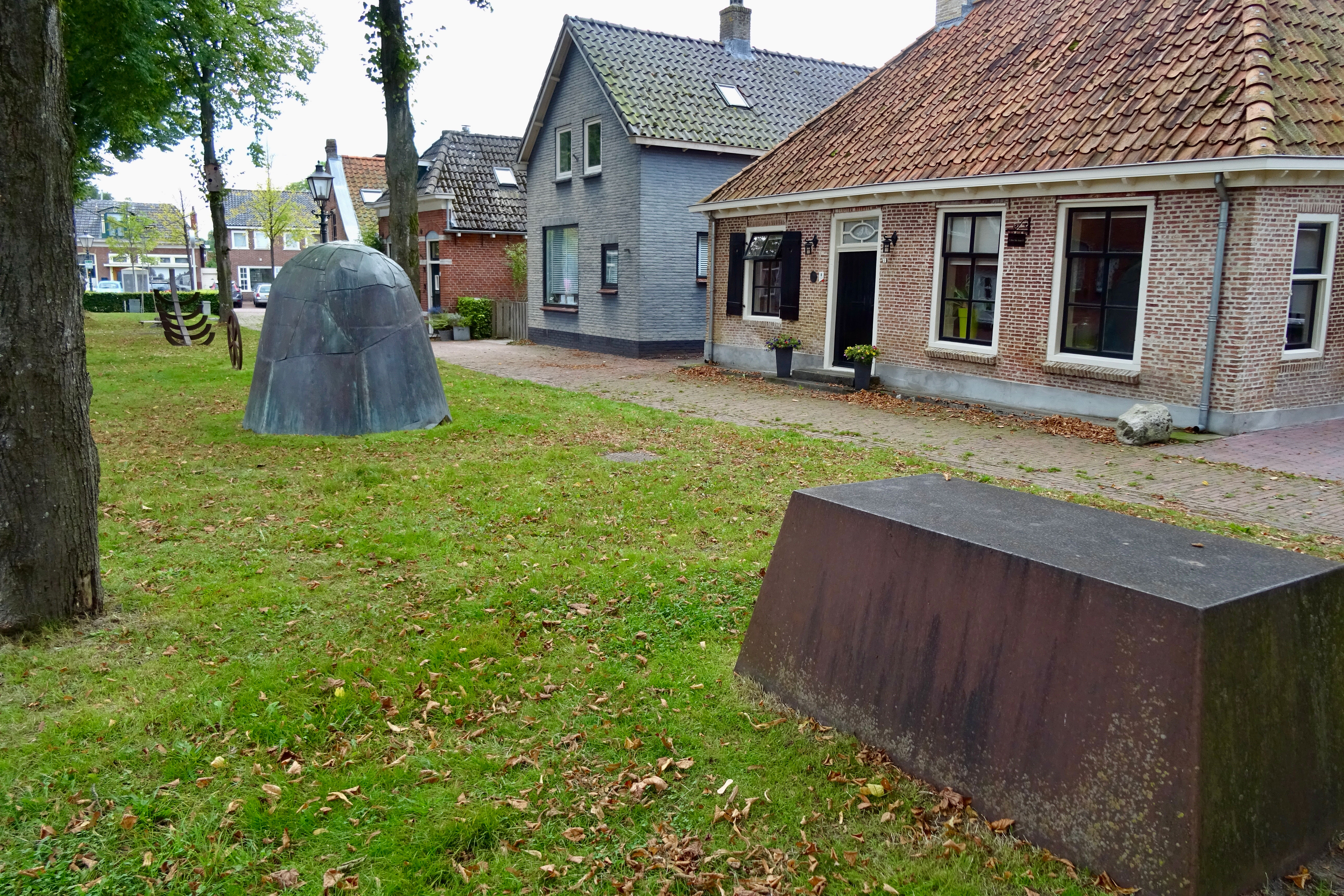
Houses in Rottevalle

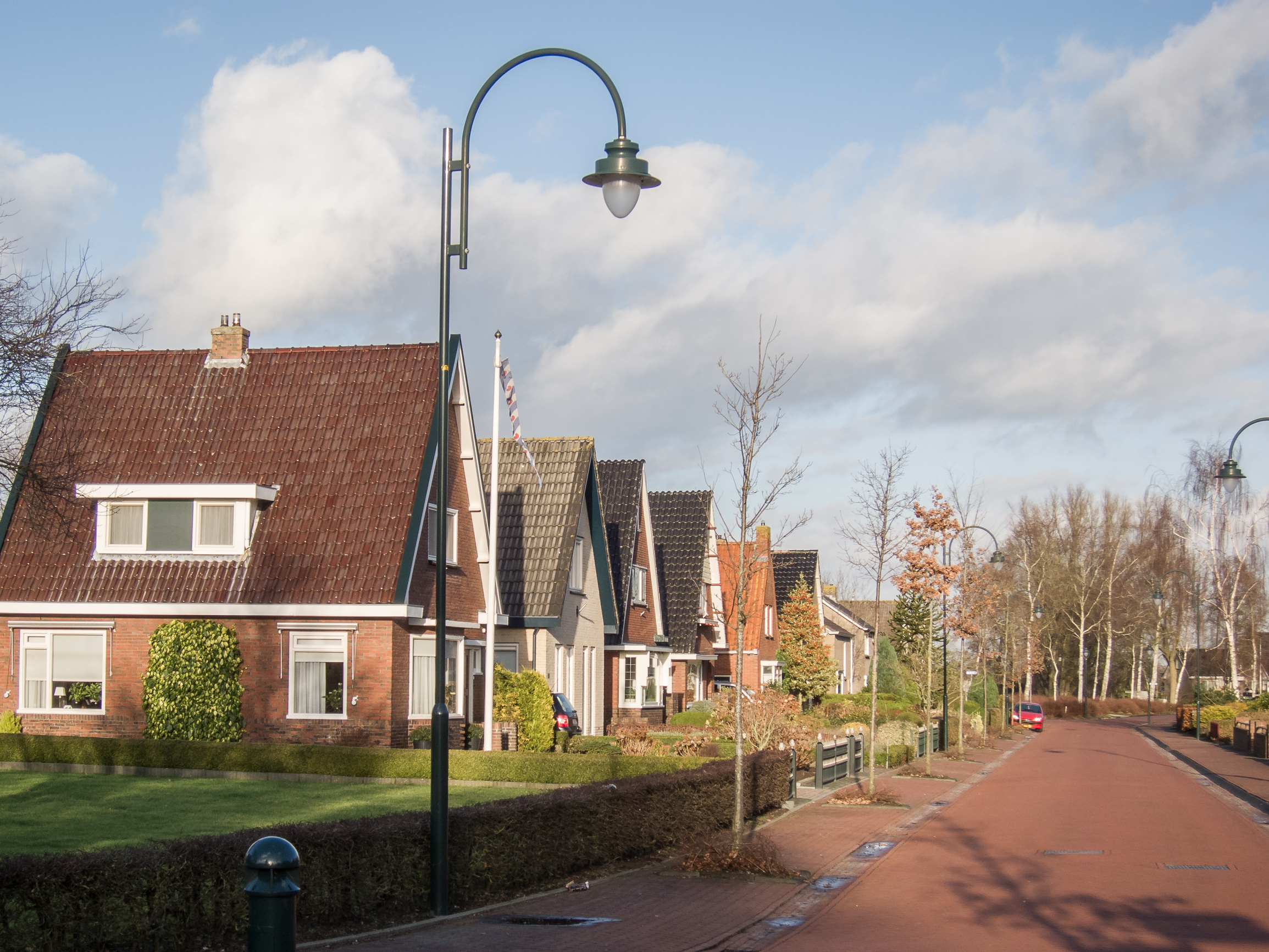
Street view
