= Alexey Georgiyevich Postnikov =

Russian mathematician (1921–1995)

Alexey Postnikov
- Born: 12 June 1921; Moscow, RSFSR
- Died: 22 March 1995 (aged 73); Moscow, Russia
- Known for: Analytic Number Theory

Alexey Georgiyevich Postnikov (Russian: Алексей Георгиевич Постников; 12 June 1921 – 22 March 1995) was a Russian mathematician, who worked on analytic number theory. He is known for the Postnikov character formula, which expresses the value of a Dirichlet character by means of a trigonometric function of a polynomial with rational coefficients.

Postnikov's father was a high-ranking economic functionary who was arrested in 1938 and became a victim of Stalin's purges. Alexei Postnikov studied from 1939 at the Lomonosov University, interrupted by WW II, so that his degree was delayed until 1946. In 1949 he received his Russian candidate degree (Ph.D.) from Lomonosov University under Alexander Gelfond with thesis On the differential independence of Dirichlet series. From 1950 Postnikov was at the Steklov Institute in Moscow in the department of number theory, led by Ivan Vinogradov, who exerted a great influence on Postnikov, who was also influenced by the Leningrad school of number theory under Yuri Linnik. In 1955 Postnikov published his famous formula, now known as the Postnikov character formula. This was also the subject of his Russian doctorate (higher doctoral recognition) in 1956 (Investigation of the method of Vinogradov for trigonometric sums (in Russian)). He was later a senior scientist at the Steklov Institute.

He also dealt with probability theory and Tauberian theorems in analysis.

In 1966, with Vinogradov, he was a Plenary Speaker of the ICM in Moscow with talk Recent developments in analytic number theory.

== Selected publications ==
- Introduction to Analytic Number Theory, American Mathematical Society, Translation of Mathematical Monographs 68, 1988 (translated from Russian original published by Nauka in Moscow in 1971)
- Arithmetical modelling of random processes, Trudy Mat. Inst. Steklov 1960 (in Russian)
- Ergodic aspects of the theory of congruences and of the theory of Diophantine approximations, Trudy Mat. Inst. Steklov 1966 (Russian), English translation Proc. Steklov Inst. Math. 1967
- Tauberian theory and its applications, Trudy Mat. Inst. Steklow 142, 1979 (Russian), English translation Proc. Steklov Inst. Math. 1980
