= Hendrik Kloosterman =

Dutch mathematician (1900–1968)

- Born: 9 April 1900; Rottevalle, Friesland
- Died: 6 May 1968 (aged 68); Leiden
- Education: Universiteit Leiden
- Scientific career
- Fields: Mathematics
- Workplaces: Universiteit Leiden
- Doctoral advisor: Jan Cornelis Kluyver
- Doctoral students: Jacob Korevaar; T. A. Springer; Jaap Murre; Fred van der Blij

Hendrik Douwe Kloosterman (9 April 1900 – 6 May 1968) was a Dutch mathematician, known for his work in number theory (in particular, for introducing Kloosterman sums) and in representation theory.

After completing his master's degree at Leiden University from 1918–1922 he studied at the University of Copenhagen with Harald Bohr and the University of Oxford with G. H. Hardy. In 1924, he received his Ph.D. in Leiden under the supervision of J. C. Kluyver. From 1926 to 1928 he studied at the Universities of Göttingen and Hamburg, and he was an assistant at the University of Münster from 1928-1930. Kloosterman was appointed lector (associate professorship) at Leiden University in 1930 and full professor in 1947. In 1950, he was elected a member of the Royal Netherlands Academy of Arts and Sciences.
