= Prime omega function =

Number of prime factors of a natural number

In number theory, the prime omega functions $\omega(n)$ and $\Omega(n)$ count the number of prime factors of a natural number $n$. The number of distinct prime factors is assigned to $\omega(n)$ (little omega - sequence A001221 in the OEIS), while $\Omega(n)$ (big omega - sequence A001222 in the OEIS) counts the total number of prime factors with multiplicity (see arithmetic function). That is, if we have a prime factorization of $n$ of the form $n = p_1^{\alpha_1} p_2^{\alpha_2} \cdots p_k^{\alpha_k}$ for distinct primes $p_i$ ($1 \leq i \leq k$), then the prime omega functions are given by $\omega(n) = k$ and $\Omega(n) = \alpha_1 + \alpha_2 + \cdots + \alpha_k$. These prime-factor-counting functions have many important number theoretic relations.

== Properties and relations ==
The function $\omega(n)$ is additive and $\Omega(n)$ is completely additive. Little omega has the formula

$\omega(n)=\sum_{p\mid n} 1,$

where notation p|n indicates that the sum is taken over all primes p that divide n, without multiplicity. For example, $\omega(12)=\omega(2^2 3)=2$.

Big omega has the formulas

$\Omega(n) =\sum_{p^\alpha\mid n} 1 =\sum_{p^\alpha\parallel n}\alpha.$

The notation p^{α}|n indicates that the sum is taken over all prime powers p^{α} that divide n, while p^{α}||n indicates that the sum is taken over all prime powers p^{α} that divide n and such that n / p^{α} is coprime to p^{α}. For example, $\Omega(12)=\Omega(2^2 3^1)=3$.

The omegas are related by the inequalities ω(n) ≤ Ω(n) and 2^{ω(n)} ≤ d(n) ≤ 2^{Ω(n)}, where d(n) is the divisor-counting function. If Ω(n) = ω(n), then n is squarefree and related to the Möbius function by

$$\mu(n) = (-1)^{\omega(n)} = (-1)^{\Omega(n)}.$$

If $\omega(n) = 1$ then $n$ is a prime power, and if $\Omega(n)=1$ then $n$ is prime.

An asymptotic series for the average order of $\omega(n)$ is

$$\frac{1}{n} \sum\limits_{k = 1}^n \omega(k) \sim \log\log n + B_1 + \sum_{k \geq 1} \left(\sum_{j=0}^{k-1} \frac{\gamma_j}{j!} - 1\right) \frac{(k-1)!}{(\log n)^k},$$

where $B_1 \approx 0.26149721$ is the Mertens constant and $\gamma_j$ are the Stieltjes constants.

The function $\omega(n)$ is related to divisor sums over the Möbius function and the divisor function, including:

$\sum_{d\mid n} |\mu(d)| = 2^{\omega(n)}$ is the number of unitary divisors. (sequence A034444 in the OEIS)
$$\sum_{d\mid n} |\mu(d)| k^{\omega(d)} = (k+1)^{\omega(n)}$$
$$\sum_{r\mid n} 2^{\omega(r)} = d(n^2)$$
$$\sum_{r\mid n} 2^{\omega(r)} d\left(\frac{n}{r}\right) = d^2(n)$$
$$\sum_{d\mid n} (-1)^{\omega(d)} = \prod\limits_{p^{\alpha}||n} (1-\alpha)$$
$$\sum_{\stackrel{1\le k\le m}{(k,m)=1}} \gcd(k^2-1,m_1)\gcd(k^2-1,m_2)
=\varphi(n)\sum_{\stackrel{d_1\mid m_1} {d_2\mid m_2}} \varphi(\gcd(d_1, d_2)) 2^{\omega(\operatorname{lcm}(d_1, d_2))},\ m_1, m_2 \text{ odd}, m = \operatorname{lcm}(m_1, m_2)$$
$$\sum_\stackrel{1\le k\le n}{\operatorname{gcd}(k,m)=1} \!\!\!\! 1 = n \frac {\varphi(m)}{m} + O \left ( 2^{\omega(m)} \right )$$

The characteristic function of the primes can be expressed by a convolution with the Möbius function:

$$\chi_{\mathbb{P}}(n)
= (\mu \ast \omega)(n) = \sum_{d|n} \omega(d) \mu(n/d).$$

A partition-related exact identity for $\omega(n)$ is given by

$$\omega(n) = \log_2\left[\sum_{k=1}^n \sum_{j=1}^k \left(\sum_{d\mid k} \sum_{i=1}^d p(d-ji) \right) s_{n,k} \cdot |\mu(j)|\right],$$

where $p(n)$ is the partition function, $\mu(n)$ is the Möbius function, and the triangular sequence $s_{n,k}$ is expanded by

$$s_{n,k} = [q^n] (q; q)_\infty \frac{q^k}{1-q^k} = s_o(n, k) - s_e(n, k),$$

in terms of the infinite q-Pochhammer symbol and the restricted partition functions $s_{o/e}(n, k)$ which respectively denote the number of $k$'s in all partitions of $n$ into an odd (even) number of distinct parts.

== Continuation to the complex plane ==
A continuation of $\omega(n)$ has been found, though it is not analytic everywhere. Note that the normalized $\operatorname{sinc}$ function $\operatorname{sinc}(x) = \frac{\sin(\pi x)}{\pi x}$ is used.

$$\omega(z) = \log_2\left(\sum_{n=1}^{\lceil Re(z) \rceil} \operatorname{sinc} \left(\prod_{m=1}^{\lceil Re(z) \rceil+1} \left( n^2+n-mz \right) \right) \right)$$

This is closely related to the following partition identity. Consider partitions of the form

$$a= \frac{2}{c} + \frac{4}{c} + \ldots + \frac{2(b-1)}{c} + \frac{2b}{c}$$

where $a$, $b$, and $c$ are positive integers, and $a > b > c$. The number of partitions is then given by $2^{\omega(a)} - 2$.

== Average order and summatory functions ==
An average order of both $\omega(n)$ and $\Omega(n)$ is $\log\log n$. When $n$ is prime a lower bound on the value of the function is $\omega(n) = 1$. Similarly, if $n$ is primorial then the function is as large as

$\omega(n) \sim \frac{\log n}{\log\log n}$

on average order. When $n$ is a power of 2, then $\Omega(n) = \log_2(n).$

Asymptotics for the summatory functions over $\omega(n)$, $\Omega(n)$, and powers of $\omega(n)$ are respectively

$$\begin{align}
\sum_{n \leq x} \omega(n) & = x \log\log x + B_1 x + o(x) \\
\sum_{n \leq x} \Omega(n) & = x \log\log x + B_2 x + o(x) \\
\sum_{n \leq x} \omega(n)^2 & = x (\log\log x)^2 + O(x \log\log x) \\
\sum_{n \leq x} \omega(n)^k & = x (\log\log x)^k + O(x (\log\log x)^{k-1}), k \in \mathbb{Z}^{+},
\end{align}$$

where $B_1 \approx 0.2614972128$ is the Mertens constant and the constant $B_2$ is defined by

$$B_2 = B_1 + \sum_{p\text{ prime}} \frac{1}{p(p-1)} \approx 1.0345061758.$$

The sum of number of unitary divisors is

$\sum_{n \le x} 2^{\omega(n)} =(x \log x)/\zeta(2) + O(x)$ (sequence A064608 in the OEIS)

Other sums relating the two variants of the prime omega functions include

$$\sum_{n \leq x} \left\{\Omega(n) - \omega(n)\right\} = O(x),$$

and

$$\#\left\{n \leq x : \Omega(n) - \omega(n) > \sqrt{\log\log x}\right\} = O\left(\frac{x}{(\log\log x)^{1/2}}\right).$$

=== Example I: A modified summatory function ===
In this example we suggest a variant of the summatory functions $S_{\omega}(x) := \sum_{n \leq x} \omega(n)$ estimated in the above results for sufficiently large $x$. We then prove an asymptotic formula for the growth of this modified summatory function derived from the asymptotic estimate of $S_{\omega}(x)$ provided in the formulas in the main subsection of this article above.

To be completely precise, let the odd-indexed summatory function be defined as

$$S_{\operatorname{odd}}(x) := \sum_{n \leq x} \omega(n) [n\text{ odd}],$$

where $[\cdot]$ denotes Iverson bracket. Then we have that

$$S_{\operatorname{odd}}(x) = \frac{x}{2} \log\log x + \frac{(2B_1-1)x}{4} + \left\{\frac{x}{4}\right\} - \left[x \equiv 2,3 \bmod{4}\right] + O\left(\frac{x}{\log x}\right).$$

The proof of this result follows by first observing that

$$\omega(2n) = \begin{cases}
\omega(n) + 1, & \text{if } n \text{ is odd; } \\
\omega(n), & \text{if } n \text{ is even,}
\end{cases}$$

and then applying the asymptotic result from Hardy and Wright for the summatory function over $\omega(n)$, denoted by $S_{\omega}(x) := \sum_{n \leq x} \omega(n)$, in the following form:

$$\begin{align}
S_\omega(x) & = S_{\operatorname{odd}}(x) + \sum_{n \leq \left\lfloor\frac{x}{2}\right\rfloor} \omega(2n) \\
& = S_{\operatorname{odd}}(x) + \sum_{n \leq \left\lfloor\frac{x}{4}\right\rfloor} \left(\omega(4n) + \omega(4n+2)\right) \\
& = S_{\operatorname{odd}}(x) + \sum_{n \leq \left\lfloor\frac{x}{4}\right\rfloor} \left(\omega(2n) + \omega(2n+1) + 1\right) \\
& = S_{\operatorname{odd}}(x) + S_{\omega}\left(\left\lfloor\frac{x}{2}\right\rfloor\right) + \left\lfloor\frac{x}{4}\right\rfloor.
\end{align}$$

=== Example II: Summatory functions for so-termed factorial moments of ω(n) ===
The computations expanded in Chapter 22.11 of Hardy and Wright provide asymptotic estimates for the summatory function

$$\omega(n) \left\{\omega(n)-1\right\},$$

by estimating the product of these two component omega functions as

$$\omega(n) \left\{\omega(n)-1\right\} = \sum_{\stackrel{pq\mid n} {\stackrel{p \neq q}{p,q\text{ prime}}}} 1 =
\sum_{\stackrel{pq\mid n}{p,q\text{ prime}}} 1 - \sum_{\stackrel{p^2\mid n}{p\text{ prime}}} 1.$$

We can similarly calculate asymptotic formulas more generally for the related summatory functions over so-termed factorial moments of the function $\omega(n)$.

== Dirichlet series ==
A known Dirichlet series involving $\omega(n)$ and the Riemann zeta function is given by

$$\sum_{n \geq 1} \frac{2^{\omega(n)}}{n^s} = \frac{\zeta^2(s)}{\zeta(2s)},\ \Re(s) > 1.$$

We can also see that

$$\sum_{n \geq 1} \frac{z^{\omega(n)}}{n^s} = \prod_p \left(1 + \frac{z}{p^s-1}\right), |z| < 2, \Re(s) > 1,$$
$$\sum_{n \geq 1} \frac{z^{\Omega(n)}}{n^s} = \prod_p \left(1 - \frac{z}{p^s}\right)^{-1}, |z| < 2, \Re(s) > 1,$$

The function $\Omega(n)$ is completely additive, where $\omega(n)$ is strongly additive (additive). Now we can prove a short lemma in the following form which implies exact formulas for the expansions of the Dirichlet series over both $\omega(n)$ and $\Omega(n)$:

Lemma. Suppose that $f$ is a strongly additive arithmetic function defined such that its values at prime powers is given by $f(p^{\alpha}) := f_0(p, \alpha)$, i.e., $f(p_1^{\alpha_1} \cdots p_k^{\alpha_k}) = f_0(p_1, \alpha_1) + \cdots + f_0(p_k, \alpha_k)$ for distinct primes $p_i$ and exponents $\alpha_i \geq 1$. The Dirichlet series of $f$ is expanded by

$$\sum_{n \geq 1} \frac{f(n)}{n^s} = \zeta(s) \times \sum_{p\mathrm{\ prime}} (1-p^{-s}) \cdot \sum_{n \geq 1} f_0(p, n) p^{-ns},
\Re(s) > \min(1, \sigma_f).$$

Proof. We can see that

$$\sum_{n \geq 1} \frac{u^{f(n)}}{n^s} = \prod_{p\mathrm{\ prime}} \left(1+\sum_{n \geq 1} u^{f_0(p, n)} p^{-ns}\right).$$

This implies that

$$\begin{align}
\sum_{n \geq 1} \frac{f(n)}{n^s} & =
\frac{d}{du}\left[\prod_{p\mathrm{\ prime}} \left(1+\sum_{n \geq 1} u^{f_0(p, n)} p^{-ns}\right)\right] \Biggr|_{u=1}
=
\prod_{p} \left(1 + \sum_{n \geq 1} p^{-ns}\right) \times \sum_{p} \frac{\sum_{n \geq 1} f_0(p, n) p^{-ns}}{
1 + \sum_{n \geq 1} p^{-ns}} \\
& = \zeta(s) \times \sum_{p\mathrm{\ prime}} (1-p^{-s}) \cdot \sum_{n \geq 1} f_0(p, n) p^{-ns},
\end{align}$$

wherever the corresponding series and products are convergent. In the last equation, we have used the Euler product representation of the Riemann zeta function.

The lemma implies that for $\Re(s) > 1$,

$$\begin{align}
D_{\omega}(s) & := \sum_{n \geq 1} \frac{\omega(n)}{n^s} = \zeta(s) P(s) \\
& \ = \zeta(s) \times \sum_{n \geq 1} \frac{\mu(n)}{n} \log \zeta(ns) \\
D_{\Omega}(s) & := \sum_{n \geq 1} \frac{\Omega(n)}{n^s} = \zeta(s) \times \sum_{n \geq 1} P(ns) \\
& \ = \zeta(s) \times \sum_{n \geq 1} \frac{\phi(n)}{n} \log\zeta(ns) \\
D_h(s) & := \sum_{n \geq 1} \frac{h(n)}{n^s} = \zeta(s) \log \zeta(s) \\
& \ = \zeta(s) \times \sum_{n \geq 1} \frac{\varepsilon(n)}{n} \log \zeta(ns),
\end{align}$$

where $P(s)$ is the prime zeta function, $h(n) = \sum_{p^k|n}{\frac{1}{k}} = \sum_{p^k||n}{H_{k}}$ where $H_{k}$ is the $k$-th harmonic number and $\varepsilon$ is the identity for the Dirichlet convolution, $\varepsilon (n) = \lfloor\frac{1}{n}\rfloor$.

== The distribution of the difference of prime omega functions ==
The distribution of the distinct integer values of the differences $\Omega(n) - \omega(n)$ is regular in comparison with the semi-random properties of the component functions. For $k \geq 0$, define

$$N_k(x) := \#(\{n \in \mathbb{Z}^{+}: \Omega(n) - \omega(n) = k\} \cap [1, x]).$$

These cardinalities have a corresponding sequence of limiting densities $d_k$ such that for $x \geq 2$

$$N_k(x) = d_k \cdot x + O\left(\left(\frac{3}{4}\right)^k \sqrt{x} (\log x)^{\frac{4}{3}}\right).$$

These densities are generated by the prime products

$$\sum_{k \geq 0} d_k \cdot z^k = \prod_p \left(1 - \frac{1}{p}\right) \left(1 + \frac{1}{p-z}\right).$$

With the absolute constant $\hat{c} := \frac{1}{4} \times \prod_{p > 2} \left(1 - \frac{1}{(p-1)^2}\right)^{-1}$, the densities $d_k$ satisfy

$$d_k = \hat{c} \cdot 2^{-k} + O(5^{-k}).$$

Compare to the definition of the prime products defined in the last section of in relation to the Erdős–Kac theorem.

== See also ==
- Additive function
- Arithmetic function
- Erdős–Kac theorem
- Omega function (disambiguation)
- Prime number
- Square-free integer
