= Jonas Kubilius =

Lithuanian mathematician

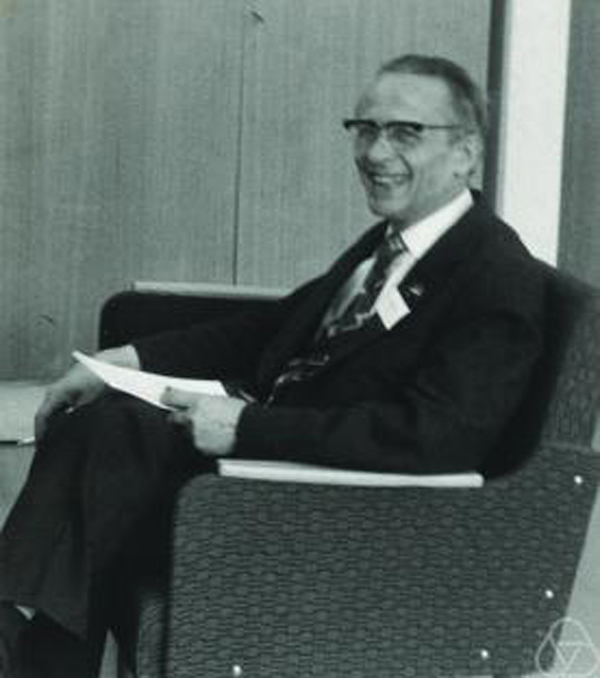
- Jonas Kubilius
- Born: 27 July 1921; Jurbarkas District Municipality, Lithuania
- Died: 30 October 2011 (aged 90); Vilnius, Lithuania
- Education: Vilnius University; Leningrad University; Steklov Institute
- Known for: Probabilistic number theory
- Awards: Order of the Lithuanian Grand Duke Gediminas
- Scientific career
- Fields: Mathematics
- Workplaces: Vilnius University; Lithuanian Academy of Sciences
- Doctoral advisor: Yuri Linnik

Jonas Kubilius (27 July 1921 – 30 October 2011) was a Lithuanian mathematician who worked in probability theory and number theory. He was rector of Vilnius University for 32 years, and served one term in the Lithuanian parliament.

== Life and education ==
Kubilius was born in Fermos village, Eržvilkas county, Jurbarkas District Municipality, Lithuania on 27 July 1921. He graduated from Raseiniai high school in 1940 and entered Vilnius University, from which he graduated summa cum laude in 1946 after taking off a year to teach mathematics in middle school.

Kubilius received the Candidate of Sciences degree in 1951 from Leningrad University. His thesis, written under Yuri Linnik, was titled Geometry of Prime Numbers. He received the Doctor of Sciences degree (habilitation) in 1957 from the Steklov Institute of Mathematics in Moscow.

== Career ==
Kubilius had simultaneous careers at Vilnius University and at the Lithuanian Academy of Sciences. He continued working at the university after receiving his bachelor's degree in 1946, and worked as a lecturer and assistant professor after receiving his Candidate degree in 1951. In 1958 he was promoted to professor and was elected rector of the university. He retired from the rector's position in 1991 after serving almost 33 years, and remained a professor in the university.

During the Khrushchev Thaw in the middle 1950s there were attempts to make the university "Lithuanian" by encouraging the use of the Lithuanian language in place of Russian and to revive the Department of Lithuanian Literature. This work was started by the rector Juozas Bulavas, but Stalinists objected and Bulavas was dismissed. Kubilius replaced him as rector and was more successful in resisting pressure to Russify the University: he returned Lithuanian language and culture to the forefront of the University. Česlovas Masaitis attributes Kubilius's success to "his ability to manipulate within the complex bureaucratic system of the Soviet Union and mainly because of his international recognition due to his scientific achievements." Kubilius also encouraged the faculty to write research papers in Lithuanian, English, German, and French, as well as in Russian, and he himself wrote several textbooks in Lithuanian. Jonas Kubilius known by pseudonym Bernotas was also involved in Lithuanian partisan movement. According to some sources Lithuanian partisans suggested him to continue studies and stay alive to work for Lithuania in the future.

In 1952 Kubilius became an employee of the Lithuanian Academy of Sciences in the Physics, Mathematics and Astronomy Sector. He initially promoted the development of probability theory in Lithuania, and later the development of differential equations and mathematical logic. In 1956 the Physical and Technical Institute was reorganized and Kubilius became head of the new Mathematical Sector. When he became rector of Vilnius University in 1958 he gave up his duties as head and was succeeded by Vytautas Statulevičius in 1960. In 1962 he was elected a member of the Academy. He held a position as Principal Scientific Worker at the Institute of Mathematics and Informatics, which split from the Lithuanian Academy of Sciences and is now an independent state scientific institute.

Kubilius's scientific work was in the areas of number theory and probability theory. The Turán–Kubilius inequality and the Kubilius model in probabilistic number theory are named after him. Eugenijus Manstavičius and Fritz Schweiger wrote about Kubilius's work in 1992, "the most impressive work has been done on the statistical theory of arithmetic functions which almost created a new research area called Probabilistic Number Theory. A monograph devoted to this topic was translated into English in 1964 and became very influential." (The monograph is Probabilistic Methods in the Theory of Numbers.)

Kubilius organized the first mathematical olympiad in Lithuania in 1951, and he wrote books of problems for students to use in preparing for the olympiads. He was a past president of the Lithuanian Mathematical Society.

In addition to his scientific and administrative work, Kubilius was a member of the Seimas (Lithuanian parliament) from 1992 to 1996.

== Honors and awards ==
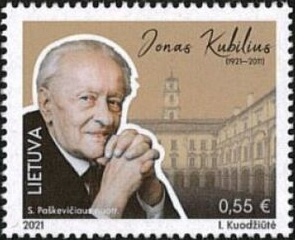
Kubilius on a 2021 stamp of Lithuania

- Order of the Lithuanian Grand Duke Gediminas

== Selected publications ==
- Kubilius, Jonas (1964). Probabilistic Methods in the Theory of Numbers. Translations of Mathematical Monographs. Vol. 11. Providence, RI: American Mathematical Society. OCLC 964247.
