= Pál Turán =

Hungarian mathematician

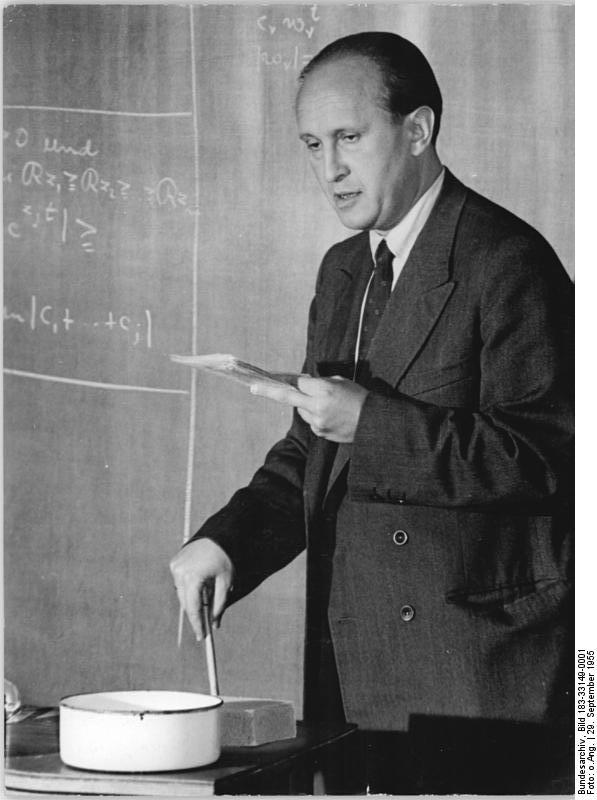
- Born: 18 August 1910; Budapest, Austria-Hungary
- Died: 26 September 1976 (aged 66); Budapest, Hungary
- Education: Eötvös Loránd University
- Known for: Extremal graph theory Turán graph Turán number Turán's brick factory problem Turán sieve Turán's inequalities Turán's lemma Turán's method Turán's theorem Turán–Kubilius inequality Erdős–Turán conjecture Erdős–Turán inequality Erdős–Turán conjecture on additive bases Erdős–Turán construction Erdős–Turán–Koksma inequality Kővári–Sós–Turán theorem
- Awards: ICM Speaker (1970); Kossuth Prize (1948, 1952)
- Scientific career
- Fields: Mathematics
- Workplaces: Eötvös Loránd University
- Doctoral advisor: Lipót Fejér
- Doctoral students: László Babai; János Pintz; Peter Szüsz

Pál Turán (Hungarian: [ˈturaːn ˈpaːl]; 18 August 1910 – 26 September 1976), also known as Paul Turán, was a Hungarian mathematician who worked primarily in extremal combinatorics.

In 1940, because of his Jewish origins, he was arrested by the Nazis and sent to a labour camp in Transylvania, later being transferred several times to other camps. While imprisoned, Turán came up with some of his best theories, which he was able to publish after the war.

Turán had a long collaboration with fellow Hungarian mathematician Paul Erdős, lasting 46 years and resulting in 28 joint papers.

== Biography ==
=== Early years ===
Turán was born into a Hungarian Jewish family in Budapest on 18 August 1910. Pál's outstanding mathematical abilities showed early, already in secondary school he was the best student.

At the same period of time, Turán and Paul Erdős were famous answerers in the journal KöMaL. On 1 September 1930, at a mathematical seminar at the University of Budapest, Turan met Erdős. They would collaborate for 46 years and produce 28 scientific papers together.

Turán received a teaching degree at the University of Budapest in 1933. In the same year he published two major scientific papers in the journals of the American and London Mathematical Societies. He got the PhD degree under Lipót Fejér in 1935 at Eötvös Loránd University.

As a Jew, he fell victim to numerus clausus, and could not get a stable job for several years. He made a living as a tutor, preparing applicants and students for exams. It was not until 1938 that he got a job at a rabbinical training school in Budapest as a teacher's assistant, by which time he had already had 16 major scientific publications and an international reputation as one of Hungary's leading mathematicians.

He married Edit (Klein) Kóbor in 1939; they had one son, Róbert.

=== In World War II ===
In September 1940 Turán was interned in labour service. As he recalled later, his five years in labour camps eventually saved his life: they saved him from ending up in a concentration camp, where 550,000 of the 770,000 Hungarian Jews were murdered during World War II. In 1940 Turán ended up in Transylvania for railway construction. Turán said that one day while working another prisoner addressed him by his surname, saying that he was working extremely clumsily:

"An officer was standing nearby, watching us work. When he heard my name, he asked the comrade whether I was a mathematician. It turned out, that the officer, Joshef Winkler, was an engineer. In his youth, he had placed in a mathematical competition; in civilian life he was a proof-reader at the print shop where the periodical of the Third Class of the Academy (Mathematical and Natural sciences) was printed. There he had seen some of my manuscripts."

Winkler wanted to help Turán and managed to get him transferred to an easier job. Turán was sent to the sawmill's warehouse, where he had to show the carriers the right-sized timbers. During this period, Turán composed and was partly able to record a long paper on the Riemann zeta function.

Turán was subsequently transferred several times to other camps. As he later recalled, the only way he was able to keep his sanity was through mathematics, solving problems in his head and thinking through problems.

In July 1944 Turán worked on a brick factory near Budapest. His and the other prisoners' task was to carry the brick cars from the kilns to the warehouses on rails that crossed at several points with other tracks. At these crossings the trolleys would "bounce" and some of the bricks would fall out, causing a lot of problems for the workers. This situation led Turan to consider how to achieve the minimum number of crossings for m kilns and n warehouses. It was only after the war, in 1952, that he was able to work seriously on this problem.

Turán was liberated in 1944, after which he was able to return to work at the rabbinical school in Budapest.

=== After WWII ===
Turán became associate professor at the University of Budapest in 1945 and full professor in 1949. In the early post-war years, the streets were patrolled by soldiers. On occasion, random people were seized and sent to penal camps in Siberia. Once such a patrol stopped Turan, who was on his way home from university. The soldiers questioned the mathematician and then forced him to show them the contents of his briefcase. Seeing a reprint of an article from a pre-War Soviet magazine among the papers, the soldiers immediately let the mathematician go. The only thing Turán said about that day in his correspondence with Erdős was that he had "come across an extremely interesting way of applying number theory..."

In 1952 he married again, the second marriage was to Vera Sós, a mathematician. They had a son, György, in 1953 (Note: Later professor of mathematics at University of Illinois Chicago). The couple published several papers together.

One of his students said Turán was a very passionate and active man - in the summer he held maths seminars by the pool in between his swimming and rowing training. In 1960 he celebrated his 50th birthday and the birth of his third son, Tamás, (Note: Tamás Turán became a philosopher and scholar of the Hebrew language.) by swimming across the Danube.

Turán was a member of the editorial boards of leading mathematical journals, he worked as a visiting professor at many of the top universities in the world. He was a member of the Polish, American and Austrian Mathematical Societies. In 1970, he was invited to serve on the committee of the Fields Prize. Turán also founded and served as the president of the János Bolyai Mathematical Society.

=== Death ===
Around 1970 Turán was diagnosed with leukemia, but the diagnosis was revealed only to his wife Vera Sós, who decided not to tell him about his illness. In 1976 she told Erdős. Sós was sure that Turán was ‘too much in love with life’ and would have fallen into despair at the news of his fatal illness, and would not have been able to work properly. Erdős said that Turán did not lose his spirit even in the Nazi camps and did brilliant work there. Erdős regretted that Turán had been kept unaware of his illness because he had put off certain works and books 'for later', hoping that he would soon feel better, and in the end was never able to finish them. Turán died in Budapest on 26 September 1976 of leukemia, aged 66.

== Work ==
Turán worked primarily in number theory, but also did much work in analysis and graph theory.

=== Number theory ===
In 1934, Turán used the Turán sieve to give a new and very simple proof of a 1917 result of G. H. Hardy and Ramanujan on the normal order of the number of distinct prime divisors of a number n, namely that it is very close to $\ln \ln n$. In probabilistic terms he estimated the variance from $\ln \ln n$. Halász says "Its true significance lies in the fact that it was the starting point of probabilistic number theory". The Turán–Kubilius inequality is a generalization of this work.

Turán was very interested in the distribution of primes in arithmetic progressions, and he coined the term "prime number race" for irregularities in the distribution of prime numbers among residue classes. With his coauthor Knapowski he proved results concerning Chebyshev's bias. The Erdős–Turán conjecture makes a statement about primes in arithmetic progression. Much of Turán's number theory work dealt with the Riemann hypothesis and he developed the power sum method (see below) to help with this. Erdős said "Turán was an 'unbeliever,' in fact, a 'pagan': he did not believe in the truth of Riemann's hypothesis."

=== Analysis ===
Much of Turán's work in analysis was tied to his number theory work. Outside of this he proved Turán's inequalities relating the values of the Legendre polynomials for different indices, and, together with Paul Erdős, the Erdős–Turán equidistribution inequality.

=== Graph theory ===
Erdős wrote of Turán, "In 1940–1941 he created the area of extremal problems in graph theory which is now one of the fastest-growing subjects in combinatorics." The field is known more briefly today as extremal graph theory. Turán's best-known result in this area is Turán's graph theorem, that gives an upper bound on the number of edges in a graph that does not contain the complete graph K_{r} as a subgraph. He invented the Turán graph, a generalization of the complete bipartite graph, to prove his theorem. He is also known for the Kővári–Sós–Turán theorem bounding the number of edges that can exist in a bipartite graph with certain forbidden subgraphs, and for raising Turán's brick factory problem, namely of determining the crossing number of a complete bipartite graph.

=== Power sum method ===
Turán developed the power sum method to work on the Riemann hypothesis. The method deals with inequalities giving lower bounds for sums of the form

$\max_{\nu=m+1,\dots,m+n} \left | \sum_{j=1}^n b_j z_j^\nu \right |,$ hence the name "power sum".

Aside from its applications in analytic number theory, it has been used in complex analysis, numerical analysis, differential equations, transcendental number theory, and estimating the number of zeroes of a function in a disk.

== Publications ==
- Ed. by P. Turán. (1970). Number Theory. Amsterdam: North-Holland Pub. Co. ISBN 978-0-7204-2037-1.
- Turán, Paul (1984), Hálasz, Gábor; Pintz, János (eds.), On a new method of analysis and its applications, Pure and Applied Mathematics (1st ed.), New York–Chichester–Brisbane–Toronto–Singapore: John Wiley & Sons, pp. XVI+584, ISBN 0-471-89255-6, MR 0749389, Zbl 0544.10045. Deals with the power sum method.
- Erdős, Paul, ed. (1990), Collected Papers of Paul Turán. Vol. 1–3., Budapest: Akadémiai Kiadó, pp. xxxviii+2665, ISBN 963-05-4298-6, MR 1056293, Zbl 0703.01019.

== Honors ==
- Hungarian Academy of Sciences elected corresponding member in 1948 and ordinary member in 1953
- Kossuth Prize in 1948 and 1952
- Tibor Szele Prize of János Bolyai Mathematical Society 1975

== Sources ==
- Hersch, Reuben (1993). "A Visit to Hungarian Mathematics". The Mathematical Intelligencer. 15 (2): 13–26. doi:10.1007/BF03024187. S2CID 122827181.
- Szüsz, P. (1980). "P. Turán: Reminiscences of his student". Journal of Approximation Theory. 29 (1): 11–12. doi:10.1016/0021-9045(80)90135-5.
- Turán, Paul (1977). "A note of welcome". Journal of Graph Theory. 1: 7–9. doi:10.1002/jgt.3190010105.
- Erdős, Paul (1998). "Some Notes on Turan's Mathematical Work" (PDF). Journal of Approximation Theory. 29 (1): 2–5. doi:10.1016/0021-9045(80)90133-1.
- Alpár, L. (1981). "In memory of Paul Turán". Journal of Number Theory. Academic Press. 13 (3): 271–. doi:10.1016/0022-314X(81)90012-3.
