= Jean-Marc Deshouillers =

French mathematician (born 1946)

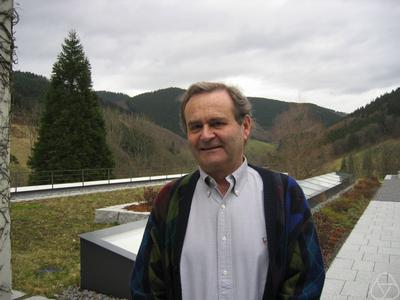
- Born: 12 September 1946 (age 79); Paris, France
- Known for: Analytic number theory
- Scientific career
- Fields: Mathematics
- Institutions: University of Bordeaux
- Doctoral advisors: Charles Pisot, Heini Halberstam
- Doctoral students: Étienne Fouvry; Olivier Ramaré; Gérald Tenenbaum; Mehdi Hassani

Jean-Marc Deshouillers (born on September 12, 1946 in Paris) is a French mathematician, specializing in analytic number theory. He is a professor at the University of Bordeaux.

== Education and career ==
Deshouillers attended the Paris École Polytechnique, graduating with an engineer diploma in 1968.

He received his PhD in 1972 at the University Paris VI Pierre et Marie Curie.

In the seventies, he was assistant professor in mathematics at the École Polytechnique, which moved from Paris to Palaiseau.

Deshouillers is a professor at the University of Bordeaux. In 2009 he was at the Institute for Advanced Study.

== Contributions ==
In 1985 he showed with Ramachandran Balasubramanian and François Dress that, in the case of the fourth powers of Waring's problem, the least number of fourth powers that is necessary to express any positive integer as a sum of fourth powers is 19.

With Henryk Iwaniec, he improved the Kuznetsov trace formula. In 1997, with Effinger and Herman te Riele, he proved the ternary Goldbach conjecture (every odd number greater than 5 is a sum of three prime numbers) under the Generalized Riemann Hypothesis. Together with François Dress and Gérald Tenenbaum he discovered the DDT theorem.

Among his students was Gérald Tenenbaum.

== Works ==
- Problème de Waring pour les bicarrés. Séminaire de théorie des nombres de Bordeaux, 1984/85, Online
