= Erdős–Wintner theorem =

Theorem in number theory

In mathematics, specifically probabilistic number theory, a real-valued function $f(n)$ on the integers is additive if $f(mn)=f(m)+f(n)$ for coprime $m$, $n$. The Erdős–Wintner theorem gives a condition under which a real-valued additive function has a limiting distribution
$$F(y)=\lim_{N\to\infty}\frac{1}{N} \#\{n<N:f(n)\leq y\}.$$
In particular, it asserts that the limiting function exists if the three following series pertaining to prime numbers converge:
$$\sum_{|f(p)|>1}\frac{1}{p}, \quad\sum_{f(p)\leqslant1}\frac{f(p)}{p}, \quad\sum_{|f(p)|\leqslant1}\frac{f(p)^2}{p}.$$
When this happens, the characteristic function $v(t)$ of the limiting distribution $F$ is equal to
$$v(t)=\prod_{p}\left(1-\frac{1}{p}\right)\bigg(1+\sum^{\infin}_{m=1}p^{-m}e^{itf(p^m)}\bigg),$$
where $i$ is the imaginary unit. Furthermore, the limiting distribution is continuous if and only if the series $\textstyle\sum_{f(p)\neq 0}\frac{1}{p}$ diverges, otherwise the distribution is purely discrete. It is an analogue of Kolmogorov's three-series theorem.
