= Turán sieve =

Estimate size of sifted sets

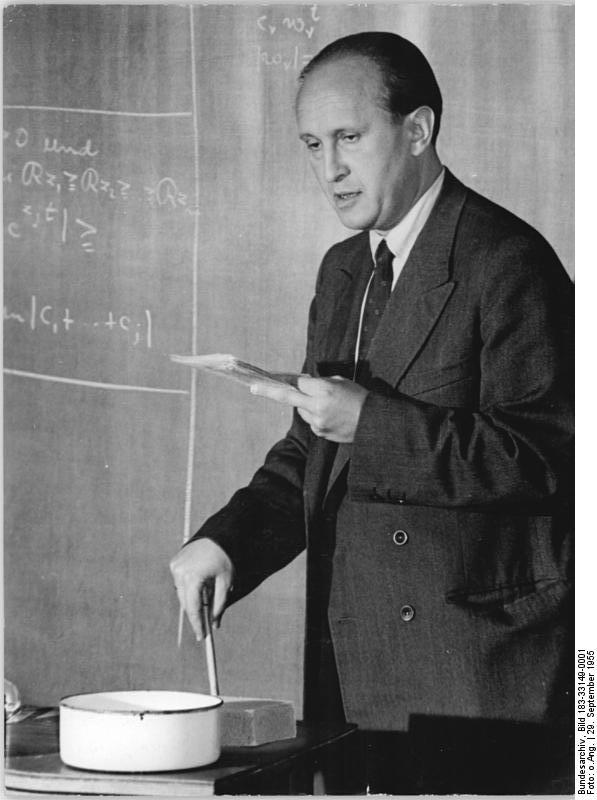
Pál Turán

In number theory, the Turán sieve is a technique for estimating the size of "sifted sets" of positive integers which satisfy a set of conditions which are expressed by congruences. It was developed by Pál Turán in 1934.

== Description ==
In terms of sieve theory the Turán sieve is of combinatorial type: deriving from a rudimentary form of the inclusion–exclusion principle. The result gives an upper bound for the size of the sifted set.

Let A be a set of positive integers ≤ x and let P be a set of primes. For each p in P, let A_{p} denote the set of elements of A divisible by p and extend this to let A_{d} be the intersection of the A_{p} for p dividing d, when d is a product of distinct primes from P. Further let A_{1} denote A itself. Let z be a positive real number and P(z) denote the product of the primes in P which are ≤ z. The object of the sieve is to estimate

$$S(A,P,z) = \left\vert A \setminus \bigcup_{p \mid P(z)} A_p \right\vert .$$

We assume that |A_{d}| may be estimated, when d is a prime p by

$$\left\vert A_p \right\vert = \frac{1}{f(p)} X + R_p$$

and when d is a product of two distinct primes d = p q by

$$\left\vert A_{pq} \right\vert = \frac{1}{f(p)f(q)} X + R_{p,q}$$

where X = |A| and f is a function with the property that 0 ≤ f(d) ≤ 1. Put

$$U(z) = \sum_{p \mid P(z)} f(p) .$$

Then

$$S(A,P,z) \le \frac{X}{U(z)} + \frac{2}{U(z)} \sum_{p \mid P(z)} \left\vert R_p \right\vert +
\frac{1}{U(z)^2} \sum_{p,q \mid P(z)} \left\vert R_{p,q} \right\vert .$$

== Applications ==
- The Hardy–Ramanujan theorem that the normal order of ω(n), the number of distinct prime factors of a number n, is log(log(n));
- Almost all integer polynomials (taken in order of height) are irreducible.
