= Deshouillers–Dress–Tenenbaum theorem =

The Deshouillers–Dress–Tenenbaum theorem (or in short DDT theorem) is a result from probabilistic number theory, which describes the probability distribution of a divisor $d$ of a natural number $n$ within the interval $[1,n]$, where the divisor $d$ is chosen uniformly. More precisely, the theorem deals with the sum of distribution functions of the logarithmic ratio of divisors to growing intervals. The theorem states that the Cesàro sum of the distribution functions converges to the arcsine distribution, meaning that small and large values have a high probability. The result is therefor also referred to as the arcsine law of Deshouillers–Dress–Tenenbaum.

The theorem was proven in 1979 by the French mathematicians Jean-Marc Deshouillers, François Dress, and Gérald Tenenbaum. The result was generalized in 2007 by Gintautas Bareikis and Eugenijus Manstavičius.

== Deshouillers–Dress–Tenenbaum theorem ==
Let $n\geq 1$ be a natural number and fix the following notation:

- $T(n,r)=\{s\in \mathbb{N}:s|n,;s\leq r\}$ is the set of divisors of $n$ that are smaller or equal than $r$.
- $\tau(n,r):=|T(n,r)|$ is the number of divisors of $n$ that are smaller or equal than $r$.
- $T(n):=T(n,n)$
- $\tau(n):=|T(n,n)|$
- $(\Omega,\mathcal{A},P)$ is a probability space.

=== Introduction ===
Let $d:\Omega \to T(n)$ be a uniformly distributed random variable on the set of divisors of $n$ and consider the logarithmic ratio

$$D_n:=\frac{\log(d)}{\log(n)}$$,

notice that the realizations of the random variable $D_n$ are characterized entirely by the divisors of $n$ and each divisor has probability $1/\tau(n)$. The distribution function of $D_n$ is defined as

$\mathbb{P}(D_n\leq t):=\frac{1}{\tau(n)}\sum\limits_{s|n, s\leq n^t}1=\frac{\tau(n,n^t)}{\tau(n)},\quad$ for $0\leq t \leq 1$.

It is easy to see that the sequence $D_1,D_2,\dots,D_n,\dots$ does not converge in distribution when considering subsequences indexed by prime numbers $D_{p_1},D_{p_2},\dots$ therefore one is interested in the Césaro sum.

=== Statement ===
Let $(D_n)_{n\geq 1}$ be a sequence of the above-defined random variables and let $x\geq 2$. Then for all $t\in[0,1]$ the Cesàro mean satisfies uniform convergence to

$\frac{1}{x}\sum\limits_{n\leq x} \mathbb{P}(D_n\leq t)=\frac{2}{\pi}\arcsin\sqrt{t}+\mathcal{O}\left(\frac{1}{\sqrt{\log(x)}}\right)$.

== Further Results ==
Eugenijus Manstavičius, Gintautas Bareikis, and Nikolai Timofeev extended the theorem by replacing the counting function $1$ in $\tau(n,v)$ with a multiplicative function $f:\mathbb{N}\to \mathbb{R}_+$ and studied the stochastic behavior of

$$X(n,v):=\frac{M(n,v)}{M(n)}$$,

where

$$M(n,v):=\sum\limits_{s|n, s\leq v}f(s), \quad M(n):=M(n,n)$$.

=== Result of Manstavičius-Timofeev ===
Let $\mathbb{D}[0,1]$ be the Skorokhod space and let $\mathcal{B}(\mathbb{D}[0,1])$ be the Borel σ-algebra. For $1\leq m\leq x$, define a discrete measure $\mu_x(\{m\}):=1/[x]$, describing the probability of selecting $m$ from $[1,x]$ with probability $1/[x]$.

Manstavičius and Timofeev studied the process $\left(X_x\right)_{x\geq m}$ with

$$X_x:=X_x(n,t)=\frac{M(n,x^t)}{M(n)}$$

for $t\in [0,1]$ and the image measure $\mu_x\circ X_x^{-1}$ on $\mathbb{D}[0,1]$.

That is, the image measure is defined for $B\in \mathcal{B}(\mathbb{D}[0,1])$ as follows:

$\mu_x(B):=\frac{1}{[x]}\sum\limits_{m\leq x} 1_{B}(X_x(m,\cdot)).$

They showed that if $f(p)=C>1$ for every prime number $p$ and $f(p^k)\geq 0$ for all prime numbers $p$ and all $k\geq 2$, then $\mu_x\circ X_x^{-1}$ converges weakly to a measure in $\mathbb{D}[0,1]$ as $x\to \infty$.

=== Result of Bareikis-Manstavičius ===
Bareikis and Manstavičius generalized the theorem of Deshouillers-Dress-Tenenbaum and derived a limit theorem for the sum

$$S_x(t):=\frac{1}{x}\sum\limits_{m\leq x}\frac{M(m,m^t)}{M(m)}$$

for a class of multiplicative functions $f$ that satisfy certain analytical properties. The resulting distribution is the more general beta distribution.
