= Kubilius model =

In mathematics, the Kubilius model relies on a clarification and extension of a finite probability space on which the behaviour of additive arithmetic functions can be modeled by a sum of independent random variables.

The method was introduced in Jonas Kubilius's monograph Tikimybiniai metodai skaičių teorijoje (published in Lithuanian in 1959) / Probabilistic Methods in the Theory of Numbers (published in English in 1964) .

Eugenijus Manstavičius and Fritz Schweiger wrote about Kubilius's work in 1992, "the most impressive work has been done on the statistical theory of arithmetic functions which almost created a new research area called Probabilistic Number Theory. A monograph (Probabilistic Methods in the Theory of Numbers) devoted to this topic was translated into English in 1964 and became very influential."
