= Erdős–Turán inequality =

In mathematics, the Erdős–Turán inequality bounds the distance between a probability measure on the circle and the Lebesgue measure, in terms of Fourier coefficients. It was proved by Paul Erdős and Pál Turán in 1948.

Let μ be a probability measure on the unit circle R/Z. The Erdős–Turán inequality states that, for any natural number n,

$$\sup_A \left| \mu(A) - \mathrm{mes}\, A \right|
\leq C \left( \frac{1}{n} + \sum_{k=1}^n \frac{|\hat{\mu}(k)|}{k} \right),$$

where the supremum is over all arcs A ⊂ R/Z of the unit circle, mes stands for the Lebesgue measure,

$$\hat{\mu}(k) = \int \exp(2 \pi i k \theta) \, d\mu(\theta)$$

are the Fourier coefficients of μ, and C > 0 is a numerical constant.

== Application to discrepancy ==
Let s_{1}, s_{2}, s_{3} ... ∈ R be a sequence. The Erdős–Turán inequality applied to the measure

$$\mu_m(S) = \frac{1}{m} \# \{ 1 \leq j \leq m \, | \, s_j \, \mathrm{mod} \, 1 \in S \}, \quad S \subset [0, 1),$$

yields the following bound for the discrepancy:

$$\begin{align}
D(m) & \left( = \sup_{0 \leq a \leq b \leq 1} \Big| m^{-1} \# \{ 1 \leq j \leq m \, | \, a \leq s_j \, \mathrm{mod} \, 1 \leq b  \} - (b-a) \Big| \right) \\[8pt]
&  \leq C \left( \frac{1}{n} + \frac{1}{m} \sum_{k=1}^n \frac{1}{k} \left| \sum_{j=1}^m e^{2 \pi i s_j k} \right|\right).
\end{align} \qquad (1)$$

This inequality holds for arbitrary natural numbers m,n, and gives a quantitative form of Weyl's criterion for equidistribution.

A multi-dimensional variant of (1) is known as the Erdős–Turán–Koksma inequality.

== Additional references ==
- Harman, Glyn (1998). Metric Number Theory. London Mathematical Society Monographs. New Series. Vol. 18. Clarendon Press. ISBN 0-19-850083-1. Zbl 1081.11057.
