= Sophie Germain Prize =

Mathematics award

The Sophie Germain Prize (in French: Prix Sophie Germain) is an annual mathematics prize awarded by the French Academy of Sciences to researchers who have carried out fundamental research in mathematics. The award has been conferred every year since 2003 and comes with a €8000 cash prize. It is named after the French mathematician Sophie Germain.

== Recipients ==
Year	Recipient
2003	Claire Voisin
2004	Henri Berestycki
2005	Jean-François Le Gall
2006	Michael Harris
2007	Ngô Bảo Châu
2008	Håkan Eliasson
2009	Nessim Sibony
2010	Guy Henniart
2011	Yves Le Jan
2012	Lucien Birgé
2013	Albert Fathi
2014	Bernhard Keller
2015	Carlos Simpson
2016	François Ledrappier
2017	Xiaonan Ma
2018	Isabelle Gallagher
2019	Bertrand Toën
2020	Georges Skandalis
2021	Étienne Fouvry
2022	Thierry Bodineau
2023	Pierre Schapira
2024	Yvan Martel
2025	Vladimir Fock

== See also ==
- List of mathematics awards
