= Lucien Birgé =

French mathematician (born 1950)

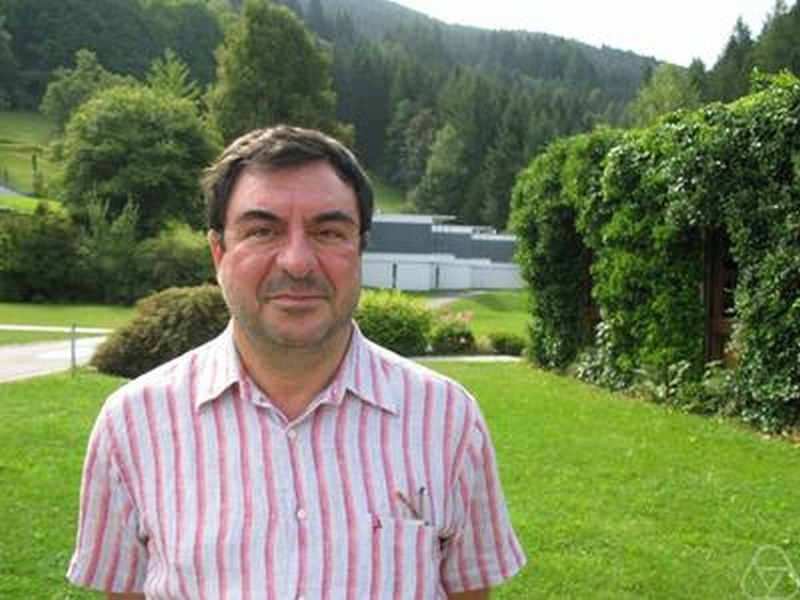
Lucien Birgé, Oberwolfach 2009

Lucien Birgé (born 1950 in France) is a French mathematician.

== Education and career ==
Lucien Birgé studied from 1970 to 1974 at the École Normale Supérieure in Paris. He then became an assistant at the Pierre and Marie Curie University (Paris 6). In 1980 he received his doctorate from the Paris Diderot University (Paris 7). The following year he became a professor at the Paris Nanterre University. Since 1990 he has been a professor at the University of Pierre and Marie Curie.

Birgé works in the field of mathematical statistics. His research deals with parametric and nonparametric statistics, model selection, adaptation, approximation, "dimension and metric entropy", and "asymptotic optimality of estimators in infinite-dimensional spaces".

In 2005 he received the Brouwer Medal of the Koninklijk Wiskundig Genootschap for the diepte, originaliteit en elegantie van zijn werk op het gebied van de mathematische statistiek (depth, originality and elegance of his work in the field of mathematical statistics). He is also an Honored Fellow of the Institute of Mathematical Statistics (IMS). In 1993 he gave one of the eight Medallion Lectures of the IMS. In 2012 Birgé received the Sophie Germain Prize.

== Selected publications ==
- Lucien Birgé: Approximation dans les espaces métriques et théorie de l’estimation. Inégalités de Cràmer-Chernoff et théorie asymptotique des tests. Dissertation, Université Paris VII, 1980

== Sources ==
- Contributors. In: IEEE Transactions on Information Theory. volume 51, number 4, 2005, pp. 1618–1624, especially p. 1618, doi:10.1109/TIT.2005.844054
- Piet Groeneboom: Lucien Birgé ontvangt Brouwerprijs 2005. In: Nieuw Archief voor Wiskunde. 5th Series, Vol. 6, 2005, No. 2, pp. 102–103, ISSN 0028-9825
