= Brouwer Medal =

The Brouwer Medal is a triennial award presented by the Royal Dutch Mathematical Society and the Royal Netherlands Academy of Sciences. The Brouwer Metal gets its name from Dutch mathematician L. E. J. Brouwer and is the Netherlands’ most prestigious award in mathematics.

== Recipients ==
- 1970 René Thom
- 1973 Abraham Robinson
- 1978 Armand Borel
- 1981 Harry Kesten
- 1984 Jürgen Moser
- 1987 Yuri I. Manin
- 1990 W. M. Wonham
- 1993 László Lovász
- 1996 Wolfgang Hackbusch
- 1999 George Lusztig
- 2002 Michael Aizenman
- 2005 Lucien Birgé
- 2008 Phillip Griffiths
- 2011 Kim Plofker
- 2014 John N. Mather
- 2017 Ken Ribet
- 2020 David Aldous
- 2023 Éva Tardos
- 2026 Christoph Thiele
