= Étienne Fouvry =

French mathematician

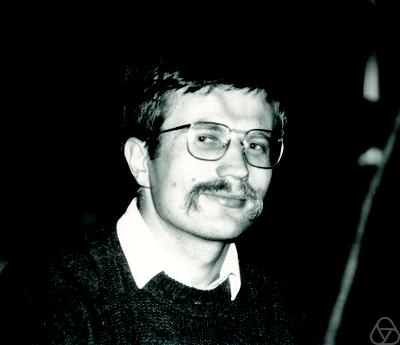
- Fouvry in 1986
- Born: 1953
- Education: University of Bordeaux
- Awards: Sophie Germain Prize (2021)
- Scientific career
- Fields: Mathematics
- Workplaces: University of Paris-Sud
- Thesis: Repartitions des suites dans les progressions arithmetiques (1981)
- Doctoral advisors: Jean-Marc Deshouillers, Henryk Iwaniec
- Website: www.math.u-psud.fr/~fouvry/

Étienne Fouvry (French pronunciation: [etjɛn fuvʁi], born 1953) is a French mathematician working primarily in analytic number theory.

Fouvry defended his dissertation in 1981 at the University of Bordeaux under the joint direction of Henryk Iwaniec and Jean-Marc Deshouillers. He is an emeritus professor at Paris-Saclay University and the 2021 recipient of the Sophie Germain Prize.

In 1985, Fouvry showed that the first case of Fermat's Last Theorem is true for infinitely many primes.
