= Extremal orders of an arithmetic function =

The extremal orders of an arithmetic function in number theory, a branch of mathematics, are the best possible bounds of the given arithmetic function. Specifically, if f(n) is an arithmetic function and m(n) is a non-decreasing function that is ultimately positive and

$$\liminf_{n \to \infty} \frac{f(n)}{m(n)} = 1$$

we say that m is a minimal order for f. Similarly if M(n) is a non-decreasing function that is ultimately positive and

$$\limsup_{n \to \infty} \frac{f(n)}{M(n)} = 1$$

we say that M is a maximal order for f. Here, $\liminf_{n \to \infty}$ and $\limsup_{n \to \infty}$ denote the limit inferior and limit superior, respectively.

The subject was first studied systematically by Ramanujan starting in 1915.

== Examples ==
- For the sum-of-divisors function σ(n) we have the trivial result
  $$\liminf_{n \to \infty} \frac{\sigma(n)}{n} = 1$$
  because always σ(n) ≥ n and for primes σ(p) = p + 1. We also have
  $$\limsup_{n \to \infty} \frac{\sigma(n)}{n \ln \ln n} = e^\gamma,$$
  proved by Gronwall in 1913. Therefore n is a minimal order and e^{−γ} n ln ln n is a maximal order for σ(n).
- For the Euler totient φ(n) we have the trivial result
  $$\limsup_{n \to \infty} \frac{\phi(n)}{n} = 1$$
  because always φ(n) ≤ n and for primes φ(p) = p − 1. We also have
  $$\liminf_{n \to \infty} \frac{\phi(n) \ln \ln n}{n} = e^{-\gamma},$$
  proven by Landau in 1903.
- For the number of divisors function d(n) we have the trivial lower bound 2 ≤ d(n), in which equality occurs when n is prime, so 2 is a minimal order. For ln d(n) we have a maximal order ln 2 ln n / ln ln n, proved by Wigert in 1907.
- For the number of distinct prime factors ω(n) we have a trivial lower bound 1 ≤ ω(n), in which equality occurs when n is a prime power. A maximal order for ω(n) is ln n / ln ln n.
- For the number of prime factors counted with multiplicity Ω(n) we have a trivial lower bound 1 ≤ Ω(n), in which equality occurs when n is prime. A maximal order for Ω(n) is ln n / ln 2
- It is conjectured that the Mertens function, or summatory function of the Möbius function, satisfies $\limsup_{n \to \infty} \frac{|M(x)|}{\sqrt{x}} = +\infty,$ though to date this limit superior has only been shown to be larger than a small constant. This statement is compared with the disproof of Mertens conjecture given by Odlyzko and te Riele in their several decades old breakthrough paper Disproof of the Mertens Conjecture. In contrast, we note that while extensive computational evidence suggests that the above conjecture is true, i.e., along some increasing sequence of $\{x_n\}_{n \geq 1}$ tending to infinity the average order of $\sqrt{x_n} |M(x_n)|$ grows unbounded, that the Riemann hypothesis is equivalent to the limit $\lim_{x \to \infty} M(x) / x^{\frac{1}{2} + \varepsilon} = 0$ being true for all (sufficiently small) $\varepsilon > 0$.

== See also ==
- Average order of an arithmetic function
- Normal order of an arithmetic function
