= Equidistribution theorem =

Integer multiples of any irrational mod 1 are uniformly distributed on the circle

Illustration of filling the unit interval (horizontal axis) with the first n terms using the equidistribution theorem with four common irrational numbers, for n from 0 to 999 (vertical axis). The 113 distinct bands for π are due to the closeness of its value to the rational number 355/113. Similarly, the 7 distinct groups are due to π being approximately 22/7. (click for detailed view)

In mathematics, the equidistribution theorem is the statement that the sequence

a, 2a, 3a, ... mod 1

is uniformly distributed on the circle $\mathbb{R}/\mathbb{Z}$, when a is an irrational number. It is a special case of the ergodic theorem where one takes the normalized angle measure $\mu=\frac{d\theta}{2\pi}$.

== History ==
While this theorem was proved in 1909 and 1910 separately by Hermann Weyl, Wacław Sierpiński and Piers Bohl, variants of this theorem continue to be studied to this day.

In 1916, Weyl proved that the sequence a, 2^{2}a, 3^{2}a, ... mod 1 is uniformly distributed on the unit interval. In 1937, Ivan Vinogradov proved that the sequence p_{n} a mod 1 is uniformly distributed, where p_{n} is the nth prime. Vinogradov's proof was a byproduct of the odd Goldbach conjecture, that every sufficiently large odd number is the sum of three primes.

George Birkhoff, in 1931, and Aleksandr Khinchin, in 1933, proved that the generalization x + na, for almost all x, is equidistributed on any Lebesgue measurable subset of the unit interval. The corresponding generalizations for the Weyl and Vinogradov results were proven by Jean Bourgain in 1988.

Specifically, Khinchin showed that the identity

$$\lim_{n\to\infty} \frac{1}{n} \sum_{k=1}^n
f( (x+ka) \bmod 1 ) = \int_0^1 f(y)\,dy$$

holds for almost all x and any Lebesgue integrable function ƒ. In modern formulations, it is asked under what conditions the identity

$$\lim_{n\to\infty} \frac{1}{n} \sum_{k=1}^n
f( (x+b_ka) \bmod 1 ) = \int_0^1 f(y)\,dy$$

might hold, given some general sequence b_{k}.

One noteworthy result is that the sequence 2^{k}a mod 1 is uniformly distributed for almost all, but not all, irrational a. Similarly, for the sequence b_{k} = 2^{k}a, for every irrational a, and almost all x, there exists a function ƒ for which the sum diverges. In this sense, this sequence is considered to be a universally bad averaging sequence, as opposed to b_{k} = k, which is termed a universally good averaging sequence, because it does not have the latter shortcoming.

A powerful general result is Weyl's criterion, which shows that equidistribution is equivalent to having a non-trivial estimate for the exponential sums formed with the sequence as exponents. For the case of multiples of a, Weyl's criterion reduces the problem to summing finite geometric series.

== See also ==
- Diophantine approximation
- Low-discrepancy sequence
- Dirichlet's approximation theorem
- Three-gap theorem
