= Omega function =

In mathematics, omega function refers to a function using the Greek letter omega, written ω or Ω.

$\Omega$ (big omega) may refer to:

- The lower bound in Big O notation, $f \in \Omega (g)\,\!$, meaning that the function $f\,\!$ dominates $g\,\!$ in some limit
- The prime omega function $\Omega(n)\,\!$, giving the total number of prime factors of $n\,\!$, counting them with their multiplicity.
- The Lambert W function $\Omega(x)\,\!$, the inverse of $y = x\cdot e^{x} \,\!$, also denoted $W(x)\,\!$.
- Absolute infinity

$\omega$ (omega) may refer to:

- The Wright omega function $\omega(x)\,\!$, related to the Lambert W Function
- The Pearson–Cunningham function $\omega_{m,n}(x)$
- The prime omega function $\omega(n)\,\!$, giving the number of distinct prime factors of $n\,\!$.
