= Hardy–Ramanujan theorem =

Analytic number theory

In mathematics, the Hardy–Ramanujan theorem, proved by Ramanujan and checked by Hardy states that the normal order of the number $\omega(n)$ of distinct prime factors of a number $n$ is $\log\log n$.

Roughly speaking, this means that most numbers have about this number of distinct prime factors.

== Precise statement ==
A more precise version states that for every real-valued function $\psi(n)$ that tends to infinity as $n$ tends to infinity
$$|\omega(n)-\log\log n|<\psi(n)\sqrt{\log\log n}$$
or more traditionally
$$|\omega(n)-\log\log n|<{(\log\log n)}^{\frac12 +\varepsilon}$$
for almost all (all but an infinitesimal proportion of) integers. That is, let $g(x)$ be the number of positive integers $n$ less than $x$ for which the above inequality fails: then $g(x)/x$ converges to zero as $x$ goes to infinity.

== History ==
A simple proof to the result was given by Pál Turán, who used the Turán sieve to prove that

$$\sum_{n \le x} | \omega(n) - \log\log x|^2 \ll x \log\log x .$$

== Generalizations ==
The same results are true of $\Omega(n)$, the number of prime factors of $n$ counted with multiplicity. This theorem is generalized by the Erdős–Kac theorem, which shows that $\omega(n)$ is essentially normally distributed. There are many proofs of this, including the method of moments (Granville & Soundararajan) and Stein's method (Harper). It was shown by Durkan that a modified version of Turán's result allows one to prove the Hardy–Ramanujan Theorem with any even moment.

== See also ==
- Almost prime
- Turán–Kubilius inequality
