= Lithuanian Mathematical Society =

Mathematical society in Lithuania

- Lietuvos matematikų draugija
- Abbreviation: LMS, LMD
- Formation: 3 February 1962; 64 years ago
- Type: Mathematical society
- Headquarters: Vilnius
- Location: Lithuania
- President: Artūras Štikonas
- Awards: Zigmas Žemaitis Medal; Young Mathematicians Prize
- Website: www.lmd.mif.vu.lt

The Lithuanian Mathematical Society or LMS (Lithuanian: Lietuvos matematikų draugija, LMD) is a mathematical society founded in 1962. The LMS is based in Vilnius, and is a founding member of the European Mathematical Society. It is a full member of the International Mathematical Union.

== History ==
Lithuania was a part of the Russian Empire from 1795 to 1914. The Lithuanian press ban, in force from 1865 to 1904, forbade the publication of material using the Latin alphabet in the Russian Empire, which made it harder to publish in Lithuanian. Shortly after the ban was lifted, the Lithuanian Learned Society was founded in 1907, which counted some mathematicians as members. From 1918 to 1940 Lithuania was an independent state, though Vilnius was occupied by Poland, and in this period the Lithuanian Society of Teachers of Mathematics and Physics was active in improving mathematics education.

In 1940 Lithuania was occupied by the Soviet Union, and in 1941 it was invaded by the Nazis as part of Operation Barbarossa. Many teachers and professors fled Lithuania; after the Second World War the country became the Lithuanian Soviet Socialist Republic, and remained a part of the Soviet Union until 1990.

The most significant Lithuanian mathematician of the Soviet period was Jonas Kubilius. Kubilius was born close to Eržvilkas, studied mathematics at Vilnius University from 1939 to 1946, and obtained his PhD from Leningrad University in 1951. Kubilius returned to Lithuania in 1951 and began working at the Lithuanian Academy of Sciences. He played a role in the formation of the Institute of Physics and Mathematics in 1956, and became an assistant director, leading the Division of Mathematics.

In 1958 Kubilius became rector of Vilnius University, replacing Juozas Bulavas who had been removed for trying to reduce Soviet influence on the university. The same year, the Institute of Physics and Mathematics held its first annual mathematics conference, where the idea of a national mathematical society was raised, and a working group was appointed to write its statutes. Kubilius' international reputation as a mathematician was growing, and the Soviets allowed the creation of the society. The Lithuanian Mathematical Society registered its statutes on 3 February 1962 under the patronage of the Lithuanian Academy of Sciences; it did not become fully independent until 2014. Kubilius served as the president of the society from its founding until his death in 2011.

== Publications ==
The LMS was involved in the founding of the Lithuanian Mathematical Journal in 1961, which since 2008 has been published by Springer. Together with Vilnius University, the LMS publishes Lietuvos matematikos rinkinys, a journal of research mathematics in both Lithuanian and English. From 1996 to 2003 the LMS published the journal α+ω, which billed itself as "a magazine for teachers, pupils, students and teachers of mathematics and computer science, for anyone interested in the problems, history and development of mathematics."

== Prizes ==
The Lithuanian Mathematical Society biennially awards its Young Mathematicians Prize (Lithuanian: jaunųjų matematikų premija) to a Lithuanian mathematician under the age of 40. Past winners are:

- 2016 – Vytautas Paškūnas
- 2018 – Kęstutis Česnavičius
- 2020 – Paulius Drungilas
- 2022 – Vidas Regelskis
- 2024 – Matas Šileikis

The Zigmas Žemaitis Medal of the LMS is awarded for contributions to science and education in Lithuania; it is named for Lithuanian mathematician Zigmas Žemaitis.

== Presidents ==
The past presidents of the Lithuanian Mathematical Society are:

- Jonas Kubilius (1962–2011)
- Eugenijus Manstavičius (2011–2014)
- Remigijus Leipus (2014–2021)
- Artūras Štikonas (2021–present)

== See also ==
- List of mathematical societies
