= Gérald Tenenbaum =

French mathematician and novelist

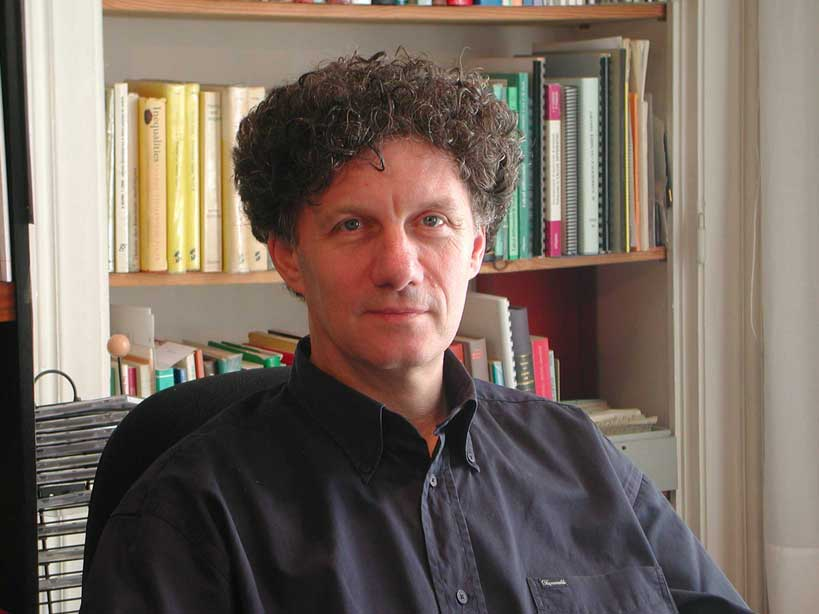
Gérald Tenenbaum, 10 July 2004.

Gérald Tenenbaum is a French mathematician and novelist, born in Nancy on 1 April 1952.

He is one of the namesakes of the Erdős–Tenenbaum–Ford constant.

== Biography ==
An alumnus of the École Polytechnique, he has been professor of mathematics at the Institut Élie Cartan at Université de Lorraine (formally université Henri Poincaré, Nancy-1) since 1981.

An associate of Paul Erdős and specialist in analytic and probabilistic number theory, Gérald Tenenbaum received the A-X Gaston Julia prize in 1976, the Albert Châtelet medal in algebra and number theory in 1985 and, together with Michel Mendès France, the Paul Doistau - Émile Blutet prize from the French Academy of Sciences in 1999

While continuing his mathematical research activities, he started publishing literary works from the 1980s on: movie criticism in the Belgian magazine Regards, a theater play in 1999, and novels from 2002 on. His novel L'Ordre des jours, published in 2008 by Héloïse d'Ormesson, received the Prix Erckmann-Chatrian the same year.

== Selected bibliography ==
=== Mathematics ===
- (with Richard R. Hall) Divisors, Cambridge, Cambridge University Press, 1988, Cambridge Tracts in Mathematics, vol. 90, ISBN 0-521-34056-X.
- Introduction à la théorie analytique et probabiliste des nombres, Institut Elie Cartan, 1990, ISBN 2903594120; 2nd rev. ed., Paris, Société Mathématique de France, 1995, ISBN 2856290329; 4th ed., Paris, Belin, 2015, Collection Échelles, ISBN 978-2701196565; translated into English, by P. Ion, as Introduction to analytic and probabilistic number theory, Graduate Studies in Mathematics #163, American Mathematical Society 2015, ISBN 978-0821898543.
- (with Michel Mendès France) Les nombres premiers, Paris, Presses Universitaires de France, 1997, collection Que sais-je? #571; translated into English, by Philip G. Spain, as The Prime Numbers and Their Distribution, American Mathematical Society, 2000, reprinted with corrections 2001, ISBN 0-8218-1647-0.
- (with Michel Mendès France) Les Nombres premiers, entre l'ordre et le chaos, Dunod, 2011, 2014, ISBN 978-2701196565.
- Théorie analytique et probabiliste des nombres : 307 exercices corrigés, with the collaboration of Jie Wu, Belin, 2014 ISBN 978-27-01183-50-3.
- Des mots et des maths, Odile Jacob, 2019 ISBN 978-2738149008.

=== Literature ===
- Trois pièces faciles, drama, L'Harmattan, 1999, ISBN 2-7384-7280-X.
- Rendez-vous au bord d'une ombre, novel, Le bord de l'eau, 2002, ISBN 2-9118-0349-3.
- Le Geste, novel, Héloïse d'Ormesson, 2006, ISBN 2-35087-012-X.
- Le Problème de Nath, juvenile novel, Belin, 2007, ISBN 2-7011-4600-3.
- L'Ordre des jours, novel, Héloïse d'Ormessson, 2008, ISBN 978-2-35087-088-5.
- Souffles couplés, novel, Héloïse d'Ormessson, 2010, ISBN 978-2-35087-136-3.
- L'Affinité des traces, novel, Héloïse d'Ormessson, 2012, ISBN 978-2-35087-190-5.
- Peau vive, novel, La Grande Ourse, 2014, ISBN 979-10-91416-22-1.
- Regards d'absence , texts accompanying the drawings of Philippe Ancel, éds. Serge Domini, 2016, ISBN 978-2354751135
- Les Harmoniques, novel, Éditions de l'Aube, 2017, ISBN 978-2815921176
- Des mots et des maths, essay, Odile Jacob, 2019, ISBN 978-2738149008.
- Reflets des jours mauves, novel, Héloïse d'Ormesson, 2019, ISBN 978-2350875569
