= Probabilistic number theory =

Subfield of number theory

In mathematics, Probabilistic number theory is a subfield of number theory, which explicitly uses probability to answer questions about the integers and integer-valued functions. One basic idea underlying it is that different prime numbers are, in some serious sense, like independent random variables. This however is not an idea that has a unique useful formal expression.

The founders of the theory were Paul Erdős, Aurel Wintner and Mark Kac during the 1930s, one of the periods of investigation in analytic number theory. Foundational results include the Erdős–Wintner theorem, the Erdős–Kac theorem on additive functions and the DDT theorem.

== See also ==
- Number theory
- Analytic number theory
- Areas of mathematics
- List of number theory topics
- List of probability topics
- Probabilistic method
- Probable prime
