= Additive function =

Function that can be written as a sum over prime factors

In number theory, an additive function is an arithmetic function $f$ on the natural numbers such that for all coprime $a$ and $b$,
$$f(a b) = f(a) + f(b).$$
It follows that for any additive function, $f(1)=0$.

An additive function is said to be completely additive if $f(a b) = f(a) + f(b)$ holds for all $a$ and $b$, even when they are not coprime. Totally additive is also used in this sense by analogy with totally multiplicative functions.

== Examples ==
=== Completely additive ===
- The restriction of the logarithmic function to $\N.$
- The multiplicity of a prime factor p in n, that is the largest exponent m for which p^{m} divides n.
- a_{0}(n) – the sum of primes dividing n counting multiplicity, sometimes called sopfr(n), the potency of n or the integer logarithm of n (sequence A001414 in the OEIS). For example:

a_{0}(4) = 2 + 2 = 4
a_{0}(20) = a_{0}(2^{2} · 5) = 2 + 2 + 5 = 9
a_{0}(27) = 3 + 3 + 3 = 9
a_{0}(144) = a_{0}(2^{4} · 3^{2}) = a_{0}(2^{4}) + a_{0}(3^{2}) = 8 + 6 = 14
a_{0}(2000) = a_{0}(2^{4} · 5^{3}) = a_{0}(2^{4}) + a_{0}(5^{3}) = 8 + 15 = 23
a_{0}(2003) = 2003
a_{0}(54,032,858,972,279) = 1240658
a_{0}(54,032,858,972,302) = 1780417
a_{0}(20,802,650,704,327,415) = 1240681

- The function Ω(n), defined as the total number of prime factors of n, counting multiple factors multiple times, sometimes called the "Big Omega function" (sequence A001222 in the OEIS). For example;

Ω(1) = 0, since 1 has no prime factors
Ω(4) = 2
Ω(16) = Ω(2·2·2·2) = 4
Ω(20) = Ω(2·2·5) = 3
Ω(27) = Ω(3·3·3) = 3
Ω(144) = Ω(2^{4} · 3^{2}) = Ω(2^{4}) + Ω(3^{2}) = 4 + 2 = 6
Ω(2000) = Ω(2^{4} · 5^{3}) = Ω(2^{4}) + Ω(5^{3}) = 4 + 3 = 7
Ω(2001) = 3
Ω(2002) = 4
Ω(2003) = 1
Ω(54,032,858,972,279) = Ω(11 ⋅ 1993^{2} ⋅ 1236661) = 4
Ω(54,032,858,972,302) = Ω(2 ⋅ 7^{2} ⋅ 149 ⋅ 2081 ⋅ 1778171) = 6
Ω(20,802,650,704,327,415) = Ω(5 ⋅ 7 ⋅ 11^{2} ⋅ 1993^{2} ⋅ 1236661) = 7.

=== Additive but not completely additive ===
- ω(n), defined as the total number of distinct prime factors of n (sequence A001221 in the OEIS). For example:

ω(4) = 1
ω(16) = ω(2^{4}) = 1
ω(20) = ω(2^{2} · 5) = 2
ω(27) = ω(3^{3}) = 1
ω(144) = ω(2^{4} · 3^{2}) = ω(2^{4}) + ω(3^{2}) = 1 + 1 = 2
ω(2000) = ω(2^{4} · 5^{3}) = ω(2^{4}) + ω(5^{3}) = 1 + 1 = 2
ω(2001) = 3
ω(2002) = 4
ω(2003) = 1
ω(54,032,858,972,279) = 3
ω(54,032,858,972,302) = 5
ω(20,802,650,704,327,415) = 5

- a_{1}(n) – the sum of the distinct primes dividing n, sometimes called sopf(n) (sequence A008472 in the OEIS). For example:

a_{1}(1) = 0
a_{1}(4) = 2
a_{1}(20) = 2 + 5 = 7
a_{1}(27) = 3
a_{1}(144) = a_{1}(2^{4} · 3^{2}) = a_{1}(2^{4}) + a_{1}(3^{2}) = 2 + 3 = 5
a_{1}(2000) = a_{1}(2^{4} · 5^{3}) = a_{1}(2^{4}) + a_{1}(5^{3}) = 2 + 5 = 7
a_{1}(2001) = 55
a_{1}(2002) = 33
a_{1}(2003) = 2003
a_{1}(54,032,858,972,279) = 1238665
a_{1}(54,032,858,972,302) = 1780410
a_{1}(20,802,650,704,327,415) = 1238677

== Multiplicative functions ==
From any additive function $f(n)$ it is possible to create a related multiplicative function $g(n),$ which is a function with the property that whenever $a$ and $b$ are coprime then:
$$g(a b) = g(a) \times g(b).$$
One such example is $g(n) = 2^{f(n)}.$ Likewise if $f(n)$ is completely additive, then $g(n) = 2^{f(n)}$ is completely multiplicative. More generally, we could consider the function $g(n) = c^{f(n)}$, where $c$ is a nonzero real constant.

== Summatory functions ==
Given an additive function $f$, let its summatory function be defined by $\mathcal{M}_f(x) := \sum_{n \leq x} f(n)$. The average of $f$ is given exactly as
$$\mathcal{M}_f(x) = \sum_{p^{\alpha} \leq x} f(p^{\alpha}) \left(\left\lfloor \frac{x}{p^{\alpha}} \right\rfloor - \left\lfloor \frac{x}{p^{\alpha+1}} \right\rfloor\right).$$

The summatory functions over $f$ can be expanded as $\mathcal{M}_f(x) = x E(x) + O(\sqrt{x} \cdot D(x))$ where
$$\begin{align}
E(x) & = \sum_{p^{\alpha} \leq x} f(p^{\alpha}) p^{-\alpha} (1-p^{-1}) \\
D^2(x) & = \sum_{p^{\alpha} \leq x} |f(p^{\alpha})|^2 p^{-\alpha}.
\end{align}$$

The average of the function $f^2$ is also expressed by these functions as
$$\mathcal{M}_{f^2}(x) = x E^2(x) + O(x D^2(x)).$$

There is always an absolute constant $C_f > 0$ such that for all natural numbers $x \geq 1$,
$$\sum_{n \leq x} |f(n) - E(x)|^2 \leq C_f \cdot x D^2(x).$$

Let
$$\nu(x; z) := \frac{1}{x} \#\!\left\{n \leq x: \frac{f(n)-A(x)}{B(x)} \leq z\right\}\!.$$

Suppose that $f$ is an additive function with $-1 \leq f(p^{\alpha}) = f(p) \leq 1$ such that as $x \rightarrow \infty$,
$$B(x) = \sum_{p \leq x} f^2(p) / p \rightarrow \infty.$$

Then $\nu(x; z) \sim G(z)$ where $G(z)$ is the Gaussian distribution function
$$G(z) = \frac{1}{\sqrt{2\pi}} \int_{-\infty}^{z} e^{-t^2/2} dt.$$

Examples of this result related to the prime omega function and the numbers of prime divisors of shifted primes include the following for fixed $z \in \R$ where the relations hold for $x \gg 1$:
$$\#\{n \leq x: \omega(n) - \log\log x \leq z (\log\log x)^{1/2}\} \sim x G(z),$$
$$\#\{p \leq x: \omega(p+1) - \log\log x \leq z (\log\log x)^{1/2}\} \sim \pi(x) G(z).$$

== See also ==
- Sigma additivity
- Prime omega function
- Multiplicative function
- Arithmetic function
