= Mertens function =

Summatory function of the Möbius function

Mertens function to n = 10000

Mertens function to n = 10000000

In number theory, the Mertens function is defined for all positive integers n as

$$M(n) = \sum_{k=1}^n \mu(k),$$

where $\mu(k)$ is the Möbius function. The function is named in honour of Franz Mertens. This definition can be extended to positive real numbers as follows:

$$M(x) = M(\lfloor x \rfloor).$$

Less formally, $M(x)$ is the count of square-free integers up to x that have an even number of prime factors, minus the count of those that have an odd number.

The first 143 M(n) values are (sequence A002321 in the OEIS)

M(n)	+0	+1	+2	+3	+4	+5	+6	+7	+8	+9	+10	+11
0+		1	0	−1	−1	−2	−1	−2	−2	−2	−1	−2
12+	−2	−3	−2	−1	−1	−2	−2	−3	−3	−2	−1	−2
24+	−2	−2	−1	−1	−1	−2	−3	−4	−4	−3	−2	−1
36+	−1	−2	−1	0	0	−1	−2	−3	−3	−3	−2	−3
48+	−3	−3	−3	−2	−2	−3	−3	−2	−2	−1	0	−1
60+	−1	−2	−1	−1	−1	0	−1	−2	−2	−1	−2	−3
72+	−3	−4	−3	−3	−3	−2	−3	−4	−4	−4	−3	−4
84+	−4	−3	−2	−1	−1	−2	−2	−1	−1	0	1	2
96+	2	1	1	1	1	0	−1	−2	−2	−3	−2	−3
108+	−3	−4	−5	−4	−4	−5	−6	−5	−5	−5	−4	−3
120+	−3	−3	−2	−1	−1	−1	−1	−2	−2	−1	−2	−3
132+	−3	−2	−1	−1	−1	−2	−3	−4	−4	−3	−2	−1

The Mertens function slowly grows in positive and negative directions both on average and in peak value, oscillating in an apparently chaotic manner passing through zero when n has the values

2, 39, 40, 58, 65, 93, 101, 145, 149, 150, 159, 160, 163, 164, 166, 214, 231, 232, 235, 236, 238, 254, 329, 331, 332, 333, 353, 355, 356, 358, 362, 363, 364, 366, 393, 401, 403, 404, 405, 407, 408, 413, 414, 419, 420, 422, 423, 424, 425, 427, 428, ... (sequence A028442 in the OEIS).

Because the Möbius function only takes the values −1, 0, and +1, the Mertens function moves slowly, and there is no x such that |M(x)| > x. H. Davenport demonstrated that, for any fixed h,

$$\sum_{n=1}^{x}\mu(n)\exp(i2\pi n\theta) = O\left(\frac{x}{\log^hx}\right)$$

uniformly in $\theta$. This implies, for $\theta=0$ that

$$M(x) = O\left(\frac{x}{\log^hx}\right)\ .$$

The Mertens conjecture went further, stating that there would be no x where the absolute value of the Mertens function exceeds the square root of x. The Mertens conjecture was proven false in 1985 by Andrew Odlyzko and Herman te Riele. However, the Riemann hypothesis is equivalent to a weaker conjecture on the growth of M(x), namely M(x) = O(x^{1/2 + ε}). Since high values for M(x) grow at least as fast as $\sqrt{x}$, this puts a rather tight bound on its rate of growth. Here, O refers to big O notation.

The true rate of growth of M(x) is not known. An unpublished conjecture of Steve Gonek states that

$$0 < \limsup_{x \to \infty} \frac{|M(x)|}{\sqrt{x} (\log \log \log x)^{5/4}} < \infty.$$

Probabilistic evidence towards this conjecture is given by Nathan Ng. In particular, Ng gives a conditional proof that the function $e^{-y/2} M(e^y)$ has a limiting distribution $\nu$ on $\mathbb{R}$. That is, for all bounded Lipschitz continuous functions $f$ on the reals we have that

$$\lim_{Y\to\infty} \frac{1}{Y} \int_0^Y f\big(e^{-y/2} M(e^y)\big) \,dy = \int_{-\infty}^\infty f(x) \,d\nu(x),$$

if one assumes various conjectures about the Riemann zeta function.

== Representations ==
=== As an integral ===
Using the Euler product, one finds that

$$\frac{1}{\zeta(s)} = \prod_p (1 - p^{-s}) = \sum_{n=1}^\infty \frac{\mu(n)}{n^s},$$

where $\zeta(s)$ is the Riemann zeta function, and the product is taken over primes. Then, using this Dirichlet series with Perron's formula, one obtains

$$\frac{1}{2\pi i} \int_{c-i\infty}^{c+i\infty} \frac{x^s}{s \zeta(s)} \, ds = M(x),$$

where c > 1.

Conversely, one has the Mellin transform

$$\frac{1}{\zeta(s)} = s \int_1^\infty \frac{M(x)}{x^{s+1}}\,dx,$$

which holds for $\operatorname{Re}(s) > 1$.

A curious relation given by Mertens himself involving the second Chebyshev function is

$$\psi(x) = M\left( \frac{x}{2} \right) \log 2 + M \left( \frac{x}{3} \right) \log 3 + M \left( \frac{x}{4}\right ) \log 4 + \cdots.$$

Assuming that the Riemann zeta function has no multiple non-trivial zeros, one has the "exact formula" by the residue theorem:

$$M(x) = \sum_\rho \frac{x^\rho}{\rho \zeta'(\rho)} - 2 + \sum_{n=1}^\infty \frac{ (-1)^{n-1} (2\pi)^{2n}}{(2n)! n \zeta(2n + 1) x^{2n}}.$$

Hermann Weyl conjectured that the Mertens function satisfied the approximate functional-differential equation

$$\frac{y(x)}{2} - \sum_{r=1}^N \frac{B_{2r}}{(2r)!} D_t^{2r-1} y \left(\frac{x}{t + 1}\right) + x \int_0^x \frac{y(u)}{u^2} \, du = x^{-1} H(\log x),$$

where H(x) is the Heaviside step function, B are Bernoulli numbers, and all derivatives with respect to t are evaluated at t = 0.

There is also a trace formula involving a sum over the Möbius function and zeros of the Riemann zeta function in the form

$$\sum_{n=1}^\infty \frac{\mu(n)}{\sqrt{n}} g(\log n) = \sum_\gamma \frac{h(\gamma)}{\zeta'(1/2 + i\gamma)} + 2 \sum_{n=1}^\infty \frac{ (-1)^n (2\pi)^{2n}}{(2n)! \zeta(2n + 1)} \int_{-\infty}^\infty g(x) e^{-x(2n+1/2)} \, dx,$$

where the first sum on the right-hand side is taken over the non-trivial zeros of the Riemann zeta function, and (g, h) are related by the Fourier transform, such that

$$2 \pi g(x) = \int_{-\infty}^\infty h(u) e^{iux} \, du.$$

=== As a sum over Farey sequences ===
Another formula for the Mertens function is

$$M(n) = -1 + \sum_{a\in\mathcal{F}_n} e^{2\pi i a},$$

where $\mathcal{F}_n$ is the Farey sequence of order n.

This formula is used in the proof of the Franel–Landau theorem.

=== As a determinant ===
M(n) is the determinant of the n × n Redheffer matrix, a (0, 1) matrix in which a_{ij} is 1 if either j is 1 or i divides j.

=== As a sum of the number of points under n-dimensional hyperboloids ===
$$M(x) = 1 - \sum_{2 \leq a \leq x} 1 + \underset{ab \leq x}{\sum_{a \geq 2} \sum_{b \geq 2}} 1 - \underset{abc \leq x}{\sum_{a \geq 2} \sum_{b \geq 2} \sum_{c \geq 2}} 1 + \underset{abcd \leq x}{\sum_{a \geq 2} \sum_{b \geq 2} \sum_{c \geq 2} \sum_{d \geq 2}} 1 - \cdots$$

This formulation expanding the Mertens function suggests asymptotic bounds obtained by considering the Piltz divisor problem, which generalizes the Dirichlet divisor problem of computing asymptotic estimates for the summatory function of the divisor function.

== Other properties ==
From we have

$$\sum_{d=1}^{n} M(n/d) = 1\ .$$

Furthermore, from

$$\sum_{d=1}^{n} M(n/d)d = \Phi(n)\ ,$$

where $\Phi(n)$ is the totient summatory function.

== Calculation ==
Neither of the methods mentioned previously leads to practical algorithms to calculate the Mertens function. Using sieve methods similar to those used in prime counting, the Mertens function has been computed for all integers up to an increasing range of x.

Person	Year	Limit
Mertens	1897	10^{4}
von Sterneck	1897	1.5×10^{5}
von Sterneck	1901	5×10^{5}
von Sterneck	1912	5×10^{6}
Neubauer	1963	10^{8}
Cohen and Dress	1979	7.8×10^{9}
Dress	1993	10^{12}
Lioen and van de Lune	1994	10^{13}
Kotnik and van de Lune	2003	10^{14}
Boncompagni	2011	10^{17}
Kuznetsov	2012	10^{22}
Helfgott and Thompson	2021	10^{23}

The Mertens function for all integer values up to x may be computed in O(x log log x) time. A combinatorial algorithm has been developed incrementally starting in 1870 by Ernst Meissel, Lehmer, Lagarias-Miller-Odlyzko, and Deléglise-Rivat that computes isolated values of M(x) in O(x^{2/3}(log log x)^{1/3}) time; a further improvement by Harald Helfgott and Lola Thompson in 2021 improves this to O(x^{3/5}(log x)^{3/5+ε}), and an algorithm by Lagarias and Odlyzko based on integrals of the Riemann zeta function achieves a running time of O(x^{1/2+ε}).

See OEIS: A084237 for values of M(x) at powers of 10.

== Known upper bounds ==
Ng notes that the Riemann hypothesis (RH) is equivalent to

$$M(x) = O\left(\sqrt{x} \exp\left(\frac{C \cdot \log x}{\log\log x}\right)\right),$$

for some positive constant $C>0$. Other upper bounds have been obtained by Maier, Montgomery, and Soundarajan assuming the RH including

$$\begin{align}
|M(x)| & \ll \sqrt{x} \exp\left(C_2 \cdot (\log x)^{\frac{39}{61}}\right) \\
|M(x)| & \ll \sqrt{x} \exp\left(\sqrt{\log x} (\log\log x)^{14}\right).
\end{align}$$

Known explicit upper bounds without assuming the RH are given by:

$$\begin{align}
|M(x)| & < \frac{12590292\cdot x}{\log^{236/75}(x)},\ \text{ for } x>\exp(12282.3) \\
|M(x)| & < \frac{0.6437752 \cdot x}{\log x},\ \text{ for } x>1 .
\end{align}$$

It is possible to simplify the above expression into a less restrictive but illustrative form as:

$$\begin{align}
M(x)= O \left( \frac{x}{\log^{\pi}(x)} \right) .
\end{align}$$

== See also ==
- Perron's formula
- Liouville's function
