= Kapranov =

Kapranov (Russian: Капранов) is a Russian masculine surname, its feminine counterpart is Kapranova. It may refer to

- Mikhail Kapranov (born 1962), Russian mathematician
- Olga Kapranova (born 1987), Russian individual rhythmic gymnast
- Roman Kapranov (born 1983), Russian Paralympian athlete
