= Montgomery's pair correlation conjecture =

Mathematical conjecture

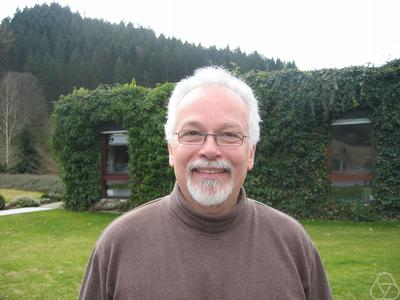
Hugh Montgomery at Oberwolfach in 2008

In mathematics, Montgomery's pair correlation conjecture is a conjecture made by Hugh Montgomery (1973) that the pair correlation between pairs of zeros of the Riemann zeta function (normalized to have unit average spacing) is

$$1-\left(\frac{\sin(\pi u)}{\pi u}\right)^{\!2},$$

which, as Freeman Dyson pointed out to him, is the same as the pair correlation function of random Hermitian matrices.

== Conjecture ==
Under the assumption that the Riemann hypothesis is true.

Let $\alpha\leq \beta$ be fixed, then the conjecture states

$$\begin{align}
\lim_{T \to \infty} \frac{\#\{(\gamma,\gamma') :0 < \gamma,\gamma' \leq T \text{ and }2\pi\alpha/\log(T)\leq \gamma -\gamma' \leq 2\pi\beta/\log(T)\}}{\frac{T}{2\pi}\log{T}}
\\
= \int\limits_\alpha^\beta 1-\left(\frac{\sin(\pi u)}{\pi u}\right)^2  \mathrm{d}u + \delta(\alpha, \beta),
\end{align}$$

where each $\gamma, \gamma'$ is the imaginary part of the non-trivial zeros of Riemann zeta function, that is $\tfrac{1}{2}+i\gamma$, and $\delta(\alpha, \beta) = 1$ if $0 \in [\alpha, \beta]$ and $\delta(\alpha, \beta) = 0$ otherwise.

== Explanation ==
Informally, this means that the chance of finding a zero in a very short interval of length 2πL/log(T) at a distance 2πu/log(T) from a zero 1/2+iT is about L times the expression above. (The factor 2π/log(T) is a normalization factor that can be thought of informally as the average spacing between zeros with imaginary part about T.) Andrew Odlyzko (1987) showed that the conjecture was supported by large-scale computer calculations of the zeros. The conjecture has been extended to correlations of more than two zeros, and also to zeta functions of automorphic representations (Rudnick & Sarnak 1996). In 1982 a student of Montgomery's, Ali Erhan Özlük, proved the pair correlation conjecture for some of Dirichlet's L-functions (A. E. Ozluk (1982)).

The connection with random unitary matrices could lead to a proof of the Riemann hypothesis (RH). The Hilbert–Pólya conjecture asserts that the zeros of the Riemann Zeta function correspond to the eigenvalues of a linear operator, and implies RH. Some people think this is a promising approach (Andrew Odlyzko (1987)).

Montgomery was studying the Fourier transform F(x) of the pair correlation function, and showed (assuming the Riemann hypothesis) that it was equal to |x| for |x| < 1. His methods were unable to determine it for |x| ≥ 1, but he conjectured that it was equal to 1 for these x, which implies that the pair correlation function is as above. He was also motivated by the notion that the Riemann hypothesis is not a brick wall, and one should feel free to make stronger conjectures.

== F(α) conjecture or strong pair correlation conjecture ==
Let again $\tfrac{1}{2}+i\gamma$ and $\tfrac{1}{2}+i\gamma'$ stand for non-trivial zeros of the Riemann zeta function. Montgomery introduced the function

$$F(\alpha):=F_T(\alpha)=\left(\frac{T}{2\pi}\log(T)\right)^{-1}\sum\limits_{0<\gamma,\gamma'\leq T}T^{i\alpha(\gamma-\gamma')}w(\gamma-\gamma')$$

for $T>2,\;\alpha\in \mathbb{R}$ and some weight function $w(u):=\tfrac{4}{(4+u^2)}$.

Montgomery and Goldston proved under the Riemann hypothesis, that for $|\alpha|\leq 1$ this function converges uniformly

$$F(\alpha)=T^{-2|\alpha|}\log (T)(1+\mathcal{o}(1))+|\alpha|+\mathcal{o}(1),\quad T\to \infty.$$

Montgomery conjectured, which is now known as the F(α) conjecture or strong pair correlation conjecture, that for $|\alpha|> 1$ we have uniform convergence

$$F(\alpha)=1+\mathcal{o}(1),\quad T\to \infty$$

for $\alpha$ in a bounded interval.

== Numerical calculation by Odlyzko ==
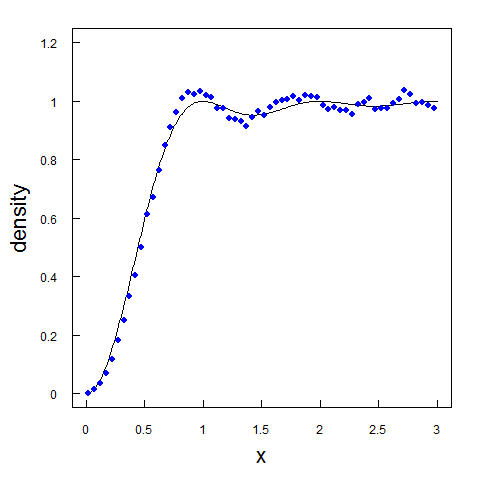
The real line describes the two-point correlation function of the random matrix of type GUE. Blue dots describe the normalized spacings of the non-trivial zeros of Riemann zeta function, the first 10^{5} zeros.

In the 1980s, motivated by Montgomery's conjecture, Odlyzko began an intensive numerical study of the statistics of the zeros of ζ(s). He confirmed the distribution of the spacings between non-trivial zeros using detailed numerical calculations and demonstrated that Montgomery's conjecture would be true and that the distribution would agree with the distribution of spacings of GUE random matrix eigenvalues using Cray X-MP. In 1987 he reported the calculations in the paper Andrew Odlyzko (1987).

For non-trivial zero, 1/2 + iγ_{n}, let the normalized spacings be

$$\delta_n = \frac{\gamma_{n+1} - \gamma_{n}}{2 \pi}\, { \log{ \frac{\gamma_n}{2 \pi} }}.$$

Then we would expect the following formula as the limit for $M, N \to\infty$:

$$\frac{1}{M} \{(n,k) \mid N \leq n \leq N+M, \,k \geq 0, \, \delta_{n} + \delta_{n+1} + \cdots +\delta_{n+k} \in [\alpha,  \beta] \} \sim \int_{\alpha}^{\beta} \left(
1- \biggl( \frac{\sin{\pi u}}{\pi u} \biggr)^2 \right) du$$

Based on a new algorithm developed by Odlyzko and Arnold Schönhage that allowed them to compute a value of ζ(1/2 + it) in an average time of t^{ε} steps, Odlyzko computed millions of zeros at heights around 10^{20} and gave some evidence for the GUE conjecture.

The figure contains the first 10^{5} non-trivial zeros of the Riemann zeta function. As more zeros are sampled, the more closely their distribution approximates the shape of the GUE random matrix.

== See also ==
- Brownian motion and Riemann zeta function
- Lehmer pair
