= Lehmer pair =

Pair of zeros of the Riemann zeta function

In the study of the Riemann hypothesis, a Lehmer pair is a pair of zeros of the Riemann zeta function that are unusually close to each other. They are named after Derrick Henry Lehmer, who discovered the pair of zeros

$$\begin{align}
& \tfrac 1 2 + i\,7005.06266\dots \\[4pt]
& \tfrac 1 2 + i\,7005.10056\dots
\end{align}$$

(the 6709th and 6710th zeros of the zeta function).

Unsolved problem in mathematics
Are there infinitely many Lehmer pairs?
More unsolved problems in mathematics

More precisely, a Lehmer pair can be defined as having the property that their complex coordinates $\gamma_n$ and $\gamma_{n+1}$ obey the inequality

$$\frac{1}{(\gamma_n-\gamma_{n+1})^2} \ge C\sum_{m\notin\{n,n+1\}}
\left(\frac{1}{(\gamma_m-\gamma_n)^2}+\frac{1}{(\gamma_m-\gamma_{n+1})^2}\right)$$

for a constant $C>5/4$.

It is an unsolved problem whether there exist infinitely many Lehmer pairs. If so, it would imply that the De Bruijn–Newman constant is non-negative, a fact that has been proven unconditionally by Brad Rodgers and Terence Tao.

== See also ==
- Montgomery's pair correlation conjecture
