= Philippe Biane =

French mathematician

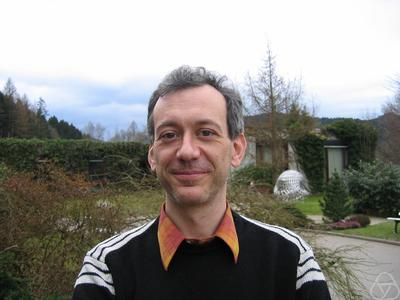
Biane at Oberwolfach in 2005

Philippe Biane (born 1962) is a French mathematician known for his contributions in probability theory and group representation. He was awarded the Rollo Davidson Prize in 1995, together with Yuval Peres.

Together with Marc Yor he studied the connections between the Brownian motion and Riemann zeta function.
