= Brownian motion and Riemann zeta function =

In mathematics, the Brownian motion and the Riemann zeta function are two central objects of study in mathematics originating from different fields - probability theory and analytic number theory - that have mathematical connections between them. The relationships between stochastic processes derived from the Brownian motion and the Riemann zeta function show in a sense intuitively the stochastic behaviour underlying the Riemann zeta function. A representation of the Riemann zeta function in terms of stochastic processes is called a stochastic representation.

== Brownian Motion and the Riemann Zeta Function ==
Let $\zeta(s)$ denote the Riemann zeta function and $\Gamma$ the gamma function, then the Riemann xi function is defined as

$$\xi(s) := \frac{1}{2}s(s-1)\pi^{-s/2}\Gamma(\tfrac{1}{2}s)\zeta(s)$$

satisfying the functional equation

$$\xi(s)=\xi(1-s),\quad \forall s\in \mathbb{C}.$$

It turns out that $2\xi(s)$ describes the moments of a probability distribution $\mu$

$$2\xi(s)=\mathbb{E}[X^s]=\int_{0}^{\infty} x^s d\mu(x),\quad \forall s\in\mathbb{C}$$

=== Brownian Bridge and Riemann Zeta Function ===
In 1987 Marc Yor and Philippe Biane proved that the random variable defined as the difference between the maximum and minimum of a Brownian bridge $(b_s)_{0\leq s\leq 1}$ describes the same distribution. A Brownian bridge is a one-dimensional Brownian motion $(W_t)_{0\leq t\leq 1}$ conditioned on $W_0=W_1=0$. They showed that

$$X=\sqrt{\frac{2}{\pi}}\left(\max\limits_{0\leq s \leq 1} b_s-\min\limits_{0\leq s \leq 1} b_s\right)$$

is a solution for the moment equation

$$2\xi(s)=\mathbb{E}[X^s]$$

However, this is not the only process related to this distribution, for example the Bessel process also gives rise to random variables with the same distribution.

=== Bessel process and Riemann Zeta Function ===
A Bessel process $\operatorname{Bes}(d)$ of order $d$ is the Euclidean norm of a $d$-dimensional Brownian motion. The $\operatorname{Bes}(3)$ process is defined as

$$R_t:=\sqrt{\left(W_t^{(1)}\right)^2+\left(W_t^{(2)}\right)^2+\left(W_t^{(3)}\right)^2}.$$

where $W_t=(W_t^{(1)},W_t^{(2)},W_t^{(3)})$ is a $3$-dimensional Brownian motion.

Define the hitting time $T_1:=\inf\{t\geq 0\colon R_t=1\}$ and let $\tilde{T_1}$ be an independent hitting time of another $\operatorname{Bes}(3)$ process. Define the random variable

$$N=\frac{\pi}{2}\left(T_1+\tilde{T_1}\right),$$

then we have

$2\xi(2s)=\mathbb{E}[N^s].$

=== Distribution ===
Let $\varphi$ be the Radon–Nikodym density of the distribution $\mu$, then the density satisfies the equation

$$\varphi(t)=2t \Theta''(t) + 3\Theta'(t)$$

for the theta function

$$\Theta(t)=\sum\limits_{n=-\infty}^{\infty}e^{-\pi n^2t}.$$

An alternative parametrization $G(y):=\Theta(y^2)$ yields

$$h(y)=2y G'(y)+y^2G''(y).$$

with explicit form

$$h(y)=4y^2\sum\limits_{n=1}^{\infty}\pi(2\pi n^4 y^2 - 3n^2)e^{-\pi n^2 y^2}$$

where $h(y)=2y\varphi(y^2)$ and

$$2\xi(s)=\int_0^{\infty} y^{s-1}h(y)dy.$$

== See also ==
- Montgomery's pair correlation conjecture
