= Goss zeta function =

Type of zeta function

In mathematics, the Goss zeta function, named after David Goss, is an analogue of the Riemann zeta function for function fields. Sheats proved that it satisfies an analogue of the Riemann hypothesis. Kapranov proved results for a higher-dimensional generalization of the Goss zeta function.
