= ZetaGrid =

Explored roots of the Riemann zeta function

ZetaGrid was at one time the largest distributed computing project, designed to explore the non-trivial roots of the Riemann zeta function, checking over one billion roots a day.

Roots of the zeta function are of particular interest in mathematics; a single root out of alignment would disprove the Riemann hypothesis, with far-reaching consequences for all of mathematics.

The project ended in November 2005 due to instability of the hosting provider. The first more than 10^{13} zeroes were checked. The project administrator stated that after the results were analyzed, they would be posted on the American Mathematical Society website. The official status remains unclear, however, as it was never published nor independently verified. This is likely because there was no evidence that each zero was actually computed, as there was no process implemented to check each one as it was calculated.
