= Andrew Odlyzko =

Polish-American mathematician (born 1949)

Andrzej Odłyżko
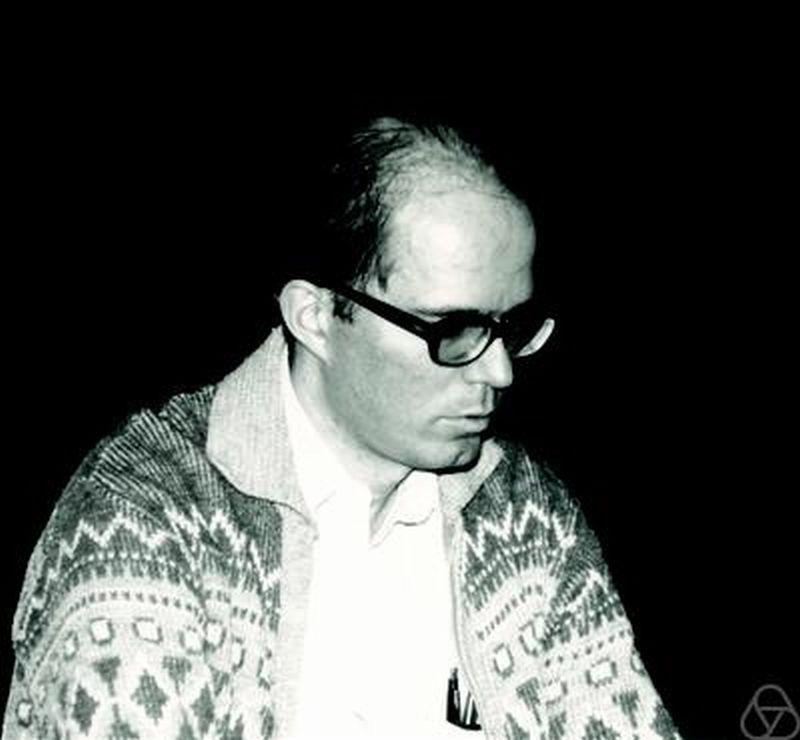
- Andrew Odlyzko, 1986 at the MFO
- Born: 23 July 1949 (age 77); Tarnów, Poland
- Education: Massachusetts Institute of Technology (Ph.D., Mathematics, 1975); California Institute of Technology (B.S., M.S., Mathematics)
- Known for: Odlyzko–Schönhage algorithm Disproving the Mertens conjecture
- Scientific career
- Fields: Mathematics
- Workplaces: Bell Telephone Laboratories, AT&T Bell Labs, AT&T Labs, University of Minnesota
- Doctoral advisor: Harold Stark

Andrew Michael Odlyzko (Andrzej Odłyżko) (born 23 July 1949) is a Polish-American mathematician and a former head of the University of Minnesota's Digital Technology Center and of the Minnesota Supercomputing Institute. He began his career in 1975 at Bell Telephone Laboratories, where he stayed for 26 years before joining the University of Minnesota in 2001.

== Work in mathematics ==
Odlyzko received his B.S. and M.S. in mathematics from the California Institute of Technology and his Ph.D. from the Massachusetts Institute of Technology in 1975.

In the field of mathematics he has published extensively on analytic number theory, computational number theory, cryptography, algorithms and computational complexity, combinatorics, probability, and error-correcting codes. In the early 1970s, he was a co-author (with D. Kahaner and Gian-Carlo Rota) of one of the founding papers of the modern umbral calculus. In 1985 he and Herman te Riele disproved the Mertens conjecture. In mathematics, he is probably known best for his work on the Riemann zeta function, which led to the invention of improved algorithms, including the Odlyzko–Schönhage algorithm, and large-scale computations, which stimulated extensive research on connections between the zeta function and random matrix theory.

In 1990, working in analytic combinatorics, Odlyzko and Philippe Flajolet developed the theory of singularity analysis.

As a direct collaborator of Paul Erdős, he has Erdős number 1.

== Work on electronic communication ==
More recently, he has worked on communication networks, electronic publishing, economics of security and electronic commerce.

In 1998, he and Kerry Coffman were the first to show that one of the great inspirations for the Internet bubble, the myth of "Internet traffic doubling every 100 days," was false.

In the paper "Content is Not King", published in First Monday in January 2001, he argues that

1. the entertainment industry is a small industry compared with other industries, notably the telecommunications industry;
2. people are more interested in communication than entertainment;
3. and therefore that entertainment "content" is not the killer app for the Internet.

In 2012, he became a fellow of the International Association for Cryptologic Research and in 2013 of the American Mathematical Society.

=== Network value ===
In the 2006 paper "Metcalfe's Law is Wrong", Andrew Odlyzko and coauthors argue that the incremental value of adding one person to a network of n people is approximately the nth harmonic number, so the total value of the network is approximately n * log(n). Since this curves upward (unlike Sarnoff's law), it implies that Metcalfe's conclusion – that there is a critical mass in networks, leading to a network effect – is qualitatively correct. But since this linearithmic function does not grow as rapidly as Metcalfe's law, it implies that many of the quantitative expectations based on Metcalfe's law were excessively optimistic.

For example, by Metcalfe, if a hypothetical network of 100,000 members has a value of $1M, doubling its membership would increase its value fourfold (200,000^{2}/100,000^{2}). However Odlyzko predicts its value would only slightly more than double: 200,000*log(200,000)/(100,000*log(100,000). Empirical tests, in part stimulated by this criticism, strongly support Metcalfe's law.

== Financial history ==
In recent years, Odlyzko has published multiple papers on the financial history of bubbles, particularly the South Sea Bubble and the English Railway Mania of the eighteenth and nineteenth centuries, respectively.

== See also ==
- Binomial type
- Digital media
- Metcalfe's law
- Montgomery's pair correlation conjecture
- Reed's law
- Riemann hypothesis
