= Mikhail Kapranov =

Russian mathematician (born 1962)

Mikhail Kapranov, (Михаил Михайлович Капранов, born 1962) is a Russian mathematician, specializing in algebraic geometry, representation theory, mathematical physics, and category theory. He is currently a professor of the Kavli Institute for the Physics and Mathematics of the Universe at the University of Tokyo.

Kapranov graduated from Lomonosov University in 1982 and received his doctorate in 1988 under the supervision of Yuri Manin at the Steklov Institute in Moscow. Afterwards he worked at the Steklov Institute and from 1990 to 1991 at Cornell University. At Northwestern University he was from 1991 to 1993 an assistant professor, from 1993 to 1995 an associate professor, and from 1995 to 1999 a full professor. He was from 1999 to 2003 a professor at University of Toronto and from 2003 to 2014 a professor at Yale University. In 1993 he was a Sloan Research Fellow. From fall 2018 to spring 2019 he was a visiting professor at the Institute for Advanced Study.

From 1989 to 1990 he collaborated with Vladimir Voevodsky on $\infty$-groupoids, following the proposal made by Alexander Grothendieck in Esquisse d'un Programme. In 1990 Voevodsky and Kapranov published “$\infty$-Groupoids as a Model for a Homotopy Category”, in which they claimed to provide a rigorous mathematical formulation and a logically valid proof of Grothendieck's idea connecting two classes of mathematical objects: $\infty$-groupoids and homotopy types. In October 1998, Carlos Simpson published on arXiv the article “Homotopy Types of Strict 3-groupoids”, which argued that the main result of the “$\infty$-groupoids” paper, published by Kapranov and Voevodsky in 1990, is false. It was not until 2013 Voevodsky convinced himself that Carlos Simpson's article is correct. Kapranov was also involved in the beginning of Voevodsky's program for the development of motivic cohomology.

With Israel Gelfand and Andrei Zelevinsky, Kapranov investigated generalized Euler integrals, $A$-hypergeometric functions, $A$-discriminants, and hyperdeterminants, and authored Discriminants, Resultants, and Multidimensional Determinants in 1994.

According to Gelfand, Kapranov, and Zelevinsky:

... in an 1848 note on the resultant, Cayley ... laid out the foundations of homological algebra. The place of discriminants in the general theory of hypergeometric functions is similar to the place of quasi-classical approximation in quantum mechanics. ... The relation between differential operators and their highest symbols is the mathematical counterpart of the relation between quantum and classical mechanics; so we can say that hypergeometric functions provide a "quantization" of discriminants.

In 1995 Kapranov provided a framework for a Langlands program for higher-dimensional schemes, and with, Victor Ginzburg and Éric Vasserot, extended the "Geometric Langlands Conjecture" from algebraic curves to algebraic surfaces.

In 1998 Kapranov was an Invited Speaker with talk Operads and Algebraic Geometry at the International Congress of Mathematicians in Berlin.

== See also ==
- Goss zeta function
