= Mertens conjecture =

Disproved mathematical conjecture

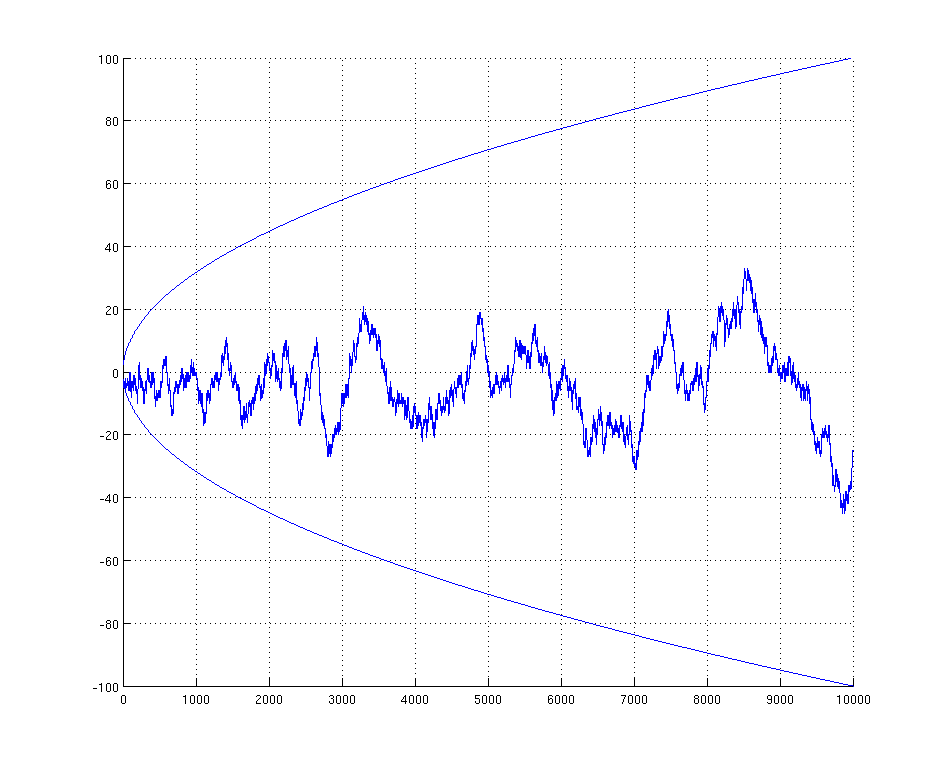
The graph shows the Mertens function $M(n)$ and the square roots $\pm \sqrt{n}$ for $n \le 10,000$. After computing these values, Mertens conjectured that the absolute value of $M(n)$ is always bounded by $\sqrt{n}$. This hypothesis, known as the Mertens conjecture, was disproved in 1985 by Andrew Odlyzko and Herman te Riele.

In mathematics, the Mertens conjecture is the statement that the Mertens function $M(n)$ is bounded by $\pm\sqrt{n}$. Although now disproven, it had been shown to imply the Riemann hypothesis. It was conjectured by Thomas Joannes Stieltjes, in an 1885 letter to Charles Hermite (reprinted in Stieltjes (1905)), and again in print by Franz Mertens (1897), and disproved by Andrew Odlyzko and Herman te Riele (1985). It is a striking example of a mathematical conjecture proven false despite a large amount of computational evidence in its favor.

== Definition ==
In number theory, the Mertens function is defined as

$$M(n) = \sum_{1 \le k \le n} \mu(k),$$

where μ(k) is the Möbius function; the Mertens conjecture is that for all n > 1,

$$|M(n)| < \sqrt{n}.$$

== Disproof of the conjecture ==
Stieltjes claimed in 1885 to have proven a weaker result, namely that $m(n) := M(n)/\sqrt{n}$ was bounded, but did not publish a proof. (In terms of $m(n)$, the Mertens conjecture is that $-1 < m(n) < 1$.)

In 1985, Andrew Odlyzko and Herman te Riele proved the Mertens conjecture false using the Lenstra–Lenstra–Lovász lattice basis reduction algorithm:

$\liminf m(n) < -1.009$ and $\limsup m(n) > 1.06.$

It was later shown that the first counterexample appears below $e^{3.21\times10^{64}} \approx 10^{1.39\times10^{64}}$ but above 10^{16}. The upper bound has since been lowered to $e^{1.59\times10^{40}}$ or approximately $10^{6.91\times10^{39}},$ and then again to $e^{1.017\times10^{29}} \approx 10^{4.416\times10^{28}}$. In 2024, Seungki Kim and Phong Nguyen lowered the bound to $e^{1.96\times10^{19}} \approx 10^{8.512\times10^{18}}$, but no explicit counterexample is known.

The law of the iterated logarithm states that if μ is replaced by a random sequence of +1s and −1s then the order of growth of the partial sum of the first n terms is (with probability 1) about √ n log log n, which suggests that the order of growth of m(n) might be somewhere around √log log n. The actual order of growth may be somewhat smaller; in the early 1990s Steve Gonek conjectured that the order of growth of m(n) was $(\log\log\log n)^{5/4},$ which was affirmed by Ng (2004), based on a heuristic argument, that assumed the Riemann hypothesis and certain conjectures about the averaged behavior of zeros of the Riemann zeta function.

In 1979, Cohen and Dress found the largest known value of $m(n) \approx 0.570591$ for M(7766842813) = 50286, and in 2011, Kuznetsov found the largest known negative value (largest in the sense of absolute value) $m(n) \approx -0.585768$ for M(11609864264058592345) = −1995900927. In 2016, Hurst computed M(n) for every n ≤ 10^{16} but did not find larger values of m(n).

In 2006, Kotnik and te Riele improved the upper bound and showed that there are infinitely many values of n for which m(n) > 1.2184, but without giving any specific value for such an n. In 2016, Hurst made further improvements by showing

$\liminf m(n) < -1.837625$ and $\limsup m(n) > 1.826054.$

== Connection to the Riemann hypothesis ==
The connection to the Riemann hypothesis is based on the Dirichlet series for the reciprocal of the Riemann zeta function,

$$\frac{1}{\zeta(s)} = \sum_{n=1}^\infty \frac{\mu(n)}{n^s},$$

valid in the region $\mathcal{Re}(s) > 1$. We can rewrite this as a Stieltjes integral

$$\frac{1}{\zeta(s)} = \int_0^\infty x^{-s} dM(x)$$

and after integrating by parts, obtain the reciprocal of the zeta function as a Mellin transform

$$\frac{1}{s \zeta(s)} = \left\{ \mathcal{M} M \right\}(-s)
= \int_0^\infty x^{-s} M(x)\, \frac{dx}{x}.$$

Using the Mellin inversion theorem we now can express M in terms of 1/ζ as

$$M(x) = \frac{1}{2 \pi i} \int_{\sigma-i\infty}^{\sigma+i\infty} \frac{x^s}{s \zeta(s)}\,ds$$

which is valid for 1 < σ < 2, and valid for 1/2 < σ < 2 on the Riemann hypothesis. From this, the Mellin transform integral must be convergent, and hence M(x) must be O(x^{e}) for every exponent e greater than 1/2. From this it follows that

$$M(x) = O\Big(x^{\tfrac{1}{2} + \epsilon}\Big)$$

for all positive ε is equivalent to the Riemann hypothesis, which therefore would have followed from the stronger Mertens hypothesis, and follows from the hypothesis of Stieltjes that

$$M(x) = O\Big(x^\tfrac{1}{2}\Big).$$
