= Herman te Riele =

Dutch mathematician (born 1947)

Hermanus Johannes Joseph te Riele (born 5 January 1947) is a Dutch mathematician at CWI in Amsterdam with a specialization in computational number theory. He is known for proving the correctness of the Riemann hypothesis for the first 1.5 billion non-trivial zeros of the Riemann zeta function with Jan van de Lune and Dik Winter, for disproving the Mertens conjecture with Andrew Odlyzko, and for factoring large numbers of world record size. In 1987, he found a new upper bound for π(x) − Li(x).

In 1970, te Riele received an engineer's degree in mathematical engineering from Delft University of Technology and, in 1976, a PhD degree in mathematics and physics from University of Amsterdam (1976).
