= Sergei Stepanov (mathematician) =

Russian mathematician

Sergei Aleksandrovich Stepanov (Сергей Александрович Степанов; 24 February 1941) is a Russian mathematician, specializing in number theory. He is known for his 1969 proof using elementary methods of the Riemann hypothesis for zeta-functions of hyperelliptic curves over finite fields, first proved by André Weil in 1940–1941 using sophisticated, deep methods in algebraic geometry.

Stepanov received in 1977 his Russian doctorate (higher doctoral degree) from the Steklov Institute under Dmitry Konstantinovich Faddeev with dissertation (translated title) An elementary method in algebraic number theory. He was from 1987 to 2000 a professor at the Steklov Institute in Moscow. In the 1990s he was also at Bilkent University in Ankara. He is at the Institute for Problems of Information Transmission of the Russian Academy of Sciences.

Stepanov is best known for his work in arithmetic algebraic geometry, especially for the Weil conjectures on algebraic curves. He gave in 1969 an "elementary" (i.e. using elementary methods) proof of a result first proved by André Weil using sophisticated methods, not readily understable by mathematicians who are not specialists in algebraic geometry. Wolfgang M. Schmidt extended Stepanov's methods to prove the general result, and Enrico Bombieri succeeded in using the work of Stepanov and Schmidt to give a substantially simplified, elementary proof of the Riemann hypothesis for zeta-functions of curves over finite fields. Stepanov's research also deals with applications of algebraic geometry to coding theory.

He was an Invited Speaker of the ICM in 1974 in Vancouver. He received in 1975 the USSR State Prize. He was elected a Fellow of the American Mathematical Society in 2012.

== Selected publications ==
- Codes on Algebraic Curves, Kluwer 1999
- Arithmetic of Algebraic Curves, New York, Plenum Publishing 1994, Russian original: Moscow, Nauka, 1991.
- as editor with Cem Yildirim: Number theory and its applications, Marcel Dekker 1999
