= Lowell Schoenfeld =

American mathematician

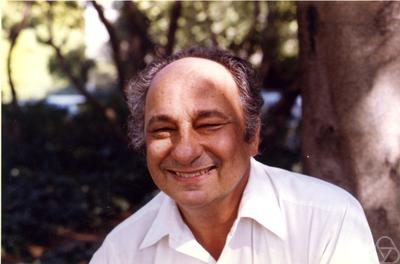
- Born: April 1, 1920
- Died: February 6, 2002 (aged 81)
- Education: University of Pennsylvania
- Scientific career
- Fields: Mathematics
- Thesis: A Transformation Formula in the Theory of Partitions (1944)
- Doctoral advisor: Hans Rademacher
- Doctoral students: Samuel Lawn

Lowell Schoenfeld (April 1, 1920 – February 6, 2002) was an American mathematician known for his work in analytic number theory.

== Career ==
Schoenfeld received his Ph.D. in 1944 from University of Pennsylvania under the direction of Hans Rademacher.

In 1953, as an assistant professor at the University of Illinois Urbana-Champaign, he married (as his second wife) associate professor Josephine M. Mitchell, causing the university to fire her from her tenured position under its anti-nepotism rules while allowing him to keep his more junior tenure-track job. They both resigned in protest, and after several short-term positions they were both able to obtain faculty positions at Pennsylvania State University in 1958. They were both promoted to full professor in 1961, and moved to the University at Buffalo in 1968.

== Contributions ==
Schoenfeld is known for obtaining the following results in 1976, assuming the Riemann hypothesis:

$$|\pi(x)-{\rm li}(x)|\le\frac{\sqrt x\,\ln x}{8\pi}$$

for all x ≥ 2657, based on the prime-counting function π(x) and the logarithmic integral function li(x), and

$$|\psi(x)-x|\le\frac{\sqrt x\,\ln^2 x}{8\pi}$$

for all x ≥ 73.2, based on the second Chebyshev function ψ(x).
