= Explicit formulae for L-functions =

Mathematical concept

In mathematics, the explicit formulae for L-functions are relations between sums over the complex number zeroes of an L-function and sums over prime powers, introduced by Riemann (1859) for the Riemann zeta function. Such explicit formulae have been applied also to questions on bounding the discriminant of an algebraic number field, and the conductor of a number field.

== Riemann's explicit formula ==
In his 1859 paper "On the Number of Primes Less Than a Given Magnitude" Riemann sketched an explicit formula (it was not fully proven until 1895 by von Mangoldt, see below) for the normalized prime-counting function π_{0}(x) which is related to the prime-counting function π(x) by

$$\pi_0(x) = \frac{1}{2} \lim_{h\to 0} \left[\,\pi(x+h) + \pi(x-h)\,\right]\,,$$

which takes the arithmetic mean of the limit from the left and the limit from the right at discontinuities. (Note: The original prime counting function can easily be recovered via $\pi(x) = \pi_0(x+1)$ for all $x \ge 3.$) His formula was given in terms of the related function

$$f(x) = \pi_0(x) + \frac{1}{2}\,\pi_0(x^{1/2}) + \frac{1}{3}\,\pi_0(x^{1/3}) + \cdots$$

in which a prime power p^{n} counts as 1/n of a prime. The normalized prime-counting function can be recovered from this function by

$\pi_0(x) = \sum_n\frac{1}{n}\,\mu(n)\,f(x^{1/n}) = f(x) - \frac{1}{2}\,f(x^{1/2}) - \frac{1}{3}\,f(x^{1/3}) - \frac{1}{5}\,f(x^{1/5}) + \frac{1}{6}\,f(x^{1/6}) - \cdots,$

where μ(n) is the Möbius function. Riemann's formula is then

$$f(x) = \operatorname{li}(x) - \sum_\rho \operatorname{li}(x^\rho) - \log(2) + \int_x^\infty \frac{dt}{t\,(t^2-1)\log(t)}$$

involving a sum over the non-trivial zeros ρ of the Riemann zeta function. The sum is not absolutely convergent, but may be evaluated by taking the zeros in order of the absolute value of their imaginary part. The function li occurring in the first term is the (unoffset) logarithmic integral function given by the Cauchy principal value of the divergent integral

$$\operatorname{li}(x) = \int_0^x \frac{dt}{\,\log(t)\,}\,.$$

The terms li(x^{ρ}) involving the zeros of the zeta function need some care in their definition as li has branch points at 0 and 1, and are defined by analytic continuation in the complex variable ρ in the region x > 1 and Re(ρ) > 0. The other terms also correspond to zeros: The dominant term li(x) comes from the pole at s = 1, considered as a zero of multiplicity −1, and the remaining small terms come from the trivial zeros. This formula says that the zeros of the Riemann zeta function control the oscillations of primes around their "expected" positions. (For graphs of the sums of the first few terms of this series see Zagier 1977.)

The first rigorous proof of the aforementioned formula was given by von Mangoldt in 1895: it started with a proof of the following formula for the Chebyshev's function ψ

$$\psi_0(x) = \dfrac{1}{2\pi i} \int_{\sigma-i \infty}^{\sigma+i \infty}\left(-\dfrac{\zeta'(s)}{\zeta(s)}\right)\dfrac{x^s}{s}\, ds = x - \sum_\rho\frac{~x^\rho\,}{\rho} - \log(2\pi) -\dfrac{1}{2}\log(1-x^{-2})$$

where the LHS is an inverse Mellin transform with

$$\sigma > 1\,, \quad \psi(x) = \sum_{p^k \le x} \log p\,,
\quad \text{and} \quad \psi_0(x) = \frac{1}{2} \lim_{h\to 0} (\psi(x+h) + \psi(x-h))$$

and the RHS is obtained from the residue theorem, and then converting it into the formula that Riemann himself actually sketched.

This series is also conditionally convergent and the sum over zeroes should again be taken in increasing order of imaginary part:

$\sum_\rho\frac{x^\rho}{\rho} = \lim_{T \to \infty} S(x,T)$ where $S(x,T) = \sum_{\rho:\left|\Im \rho\right| \le T} \frac{x^\rho}{\rho}\,.$

The error involved in truncating the sum to S(x,T) is always smaller than ln(x) in absolute value, and when divided by the natural logarithm of x, has absolute value smaller than x/T divided by the distance from x to the nearest prime power.

== Weil's explicit formula ==
There are several slightly different ways to state the explicit formula. André Weil's form of the explicit formula states

$$\begin{align}
& \Phi(1)+\Phi(0)-\sum_\rho\Phi(\rho) \\
& = \sum_{p,m} \frac{\log(p)}{p^{m/2}} \Big ( F(\log(p^m)) + F(-\log(p^m)) \Big ) - \frac{1}{2\pi} \int_{-\infty}^\infty \varphi(t)\Psi(t)\,dt
\end{align}$$

where

- ρ runs over the non-trivial zeros of the zeta function
- p runs over positive primes
- m runs over positive integers
- F is a smooth function all of whose derivatives are rapidly decreasing
- $\varphi$ is a Fourier transform of F:
  $$\varphi(t) = \int_{-\infty}^\infty F(x)e^{itx}\,dx$$
- $\Phi(1/2 + it) = \varphi(t)$
- $\Psi(t) = - \log( \pi ) + \operatorname{Re}(\psi(1/4 + it/2))$, where $\psi$ is the digamma function Γ′/Γ.

Roughly speaking, the explicit formula says the Fourier transform of the zeros of the zeta function is the set of prime powers plus some elementary factors. Once this is said, the formula comes from the fact that the Fourier transform is a unitary operator, so that a scalar product in time domain is equal to the scalar product of the Fourier transforms in the frequency domain.

The terms in the formula arise in the following way.

- The terms on the right hand side come from the logarithmic derivative of
  $$\zeta^*(s)= \Gamma(s/2)\pi^{-s/2}\prod_p \frac{1}{1-p^{-s}}$$
  with the terms corresponding to the prime p coming from the Euler factor of p, and the term at the end involving Ψ coming from the gamma factor (the Euler factor at infinity).
- The left-hand side is a sum over all zeros of ζ^{*} counted with multiplicities, so the poles at 0 and 1 are counted as zeros of order −1.

Weil's explicit formula can be understood like this. The target is to be able to write that:

$$\frac{d}{du} \left[ \sum_{n \le e^{|u|}} \Lambda(n) + \frac{1}{2} \ln(1-e^{-2|u|})\right]  = \sum_{n=1}^\infty \Lambda(n) \left[ \delta(u+\ln n) + \delta(u-\ln n) \right] + \frac{1}{2}\frac{d\ln(1-e^{-2|u|})}{du} = e^u - \sum_\rho e^{\rho u} ,$$

where Λ is the von Mangoldt function.

So that the Fourier transform of the non trivial zeros is equal to the primes power symmetrized plus a minor term. Of course, the sum involved are not convergent, but the trick is to use the unitary property of Fourier transform which is that it preserves scalar product:

$$\int_{-\infty}^\infty f(u) g^*(u) \, du = \int_{-\infty}^\infty F(t) G^*(t) \, dt$$

where $F,G$ are the Fourier transforms of $f,g$. At a first look, it seems to be a formula for functions only, but in fact in many cases it also works when $g$ is a distribution. Hence, by setting
$$g(u) = \sum_{n=1}^\infty \Lambda(n) \left[ \delta(u+\ln n) + \delta(u-\ln n) \right] ,$$
where $\delta(u)$ is the Dirac delta, and carefully choosing a function $f$ and its Fourier transform, we get the formula above.

== Explicit formulae for other arithmetical functions ==
The Riemann-Weil formula can be generalized to arithmetical functions other than the von Mangoldt function. For example for the Möbius function we have

$$\sum_{n=1}^{\infty} \frac{\mu(n)}{\sqrt{n}}g(\log n)=\sum_{\rho}\frac{h( \gamma)}{\zeta '( \rho )} + \sum_{n=1}^{\infty} \frac{1}{\zeta ' (-2n)} \int_{-\infty}^{\infty}g(x)e^{-(2n+1/2)x}dx .$$

Also for the Liouville function we have

$$\sum_{n=1}^\infty \frac{\lambda(n)}{\sqrt{n}}g(\log n) = \sum_{\rho}\frac{h( \gamma)\zeta(2 \rho )}{\zeta'( \rho)} + \frac{1}{2\zeta (1/2)}\int_{-\infty}^\infty g(x)dx .$$

For the Euler-Phi function the explicit formula reads

$$\sum_{n=1}^{\infty} \frac{\varphi (n)}{\sqrt{n}}g(\log n) = \frac{6}{\pi ^2} \int_{-\infty}^\infty g(x) e^{3x/2} dx + \sum_\rho \frac{h( \gamma)\zeta(\rho -1 )}{\zeta '( \rho)} + \sum_{n=1}^\infty \frac{\zeta (-2n-1)}{\zeta'(-2n)} \int_{-\infty}^\infty g(x)e^{-x(2n+1/2)} dx .$$

Assuming Riemann zeta function has only simple zeros. In all cases the sum is related to the imaginary part of the Riemann zeros $\rho = \frac{1}{2}+i \gamma$ and the function h is related to the test function g by a Fourier transform, $g(u) = \frac{1}{2\pi} \int_{-\infty}^\infty h(x) \exp(-iux) dx$.

For the divisor function of zeroth order $\sum_{n=1}^\infty \sigma_0 (n) f(n) = \sum_ {m=-\infty}^\infty \sum_{n=1}^\infty f(mn)$.

Using a test function of the form $g(x) = f(ye^{x}) e^{ax}$ for some positive a turns the Poisson summation formula into a formula involving the Mellin transform. Here y is a real parameter.

== Generalizations ==
The Riemann zeta function can be replaced by a Dirichlet L-function of a Dirichlet character χ. The sum over prime powers then gets extra factors of χ(p^{m}), and the terms Φ(1) and Φ(0) disappear because the L-series has no poles.

More generally, the Riemann zeta function and the L-series can be replaced by the Dedekind zeta function of an algebraic number field or a Hecke L-series. The sum over primes then gets replaced by a sum over prime ideals.

== Applications ==
Riemann's original use of the explicit formula was to give an exact formula for the number of primes less than a given number. To do this, take F(log(y)) to be y^{1/2}/log(y) for 0 ≤ y ≤ x and 0 elsewhere. Then the main term of the sum on the right is the number of primes less than x. The main term on the left is Φ(1); which turns out to be the dominant terms of the prime number theorem, and the main correction is the sum over non-trivial zeros of the zeta function. (There is a minor technical problem in using this case, in that the function F does not satisfy the smoothness condition.)

== Hilbert–Pólya conjecture ==
According to the Hilbert–Pólya conjecture, the complex zeroes ρ should be the eigenvalues of some linear operator T. The sum over the zeros of the explicit formula is then (at least formally) given by a trace:

$$\sum_\rho F(\rho) = \operatorname{Tr}(F(\widehat T )).\!$$

Development of the explicit formulae for a wide class of L-functions was given by Weil (1952), who first extended the idea to local zeta-functions, and formulated a version of a generalized Riemann hypothesis in this setting, as a positivity statement for a generalized function on a topological group. More recent work by Alain Connes has gone much further into the functional-analytic background, providing a trace formula the validity of which is equivalent to such a generalized Riemann hypothesis. A slightly different point of view was given by Meyer (2005), who derived the explicit formula of Weil via harmonic analysis on adelic spaces.

== See also ==
- Selberg trace formula
- Selberg zeta function
