= Selberg's identity =

Approximate identity involving logarithms of primes

In number theory, Selberg's identity is an approximate identity involving logarithms of primes found by Atle Selberg. The identity forms the crucial starting point in the first elementary proof for the prime number theorem, arrived at jointly by Selberg and Paul Erdős.

== Statement ==
There are several different but equivalent forms of Selberg's identity. One form is

$$\sum_{p<x}(\log p)^2 +\sum_{pq<x}\log p \log q = 2x\log x +O(x)$$

where the sums are over primes p and q.

== Explanation ==
The strange-looking expression on the left side of Selberg's identity is (up to smaller terms) the sum

$$\sum_{n<x} c_n$$

where the numbers

$$c_n = \Lambda(n)\log n +\sum_{d\,|\,n}\Lambda(d)\Lambda(n/d)$$

are the coefficients of the Dirichlet series

$$\frac{\zeta^{\prime \prime}(s)}{\zeta(s)}=\left(\frac{\zeta^{\prime }(s)}{\zeta(s)}\right)^\prime +\left(\frac{\zeta^{\prime }(s)}{\zeta(s)}\right)^2=\sum \frac{c_n}{n^s}.$$

This function has a pole of order 2 at s = 1 with coefficient 2, which gives the dominant term 2x log(x) in the asymptotic expansion of $\sum_{n<x} c_n.$

== Another variation of the identity ==
Selberg's identity sometimes also refers to the following divisor sum identity involving the von Mangoldt function and the Möbius function when $n \geq 1$:

$$\Lambda(n) \log(n) + \sum_{d\,|\,n} \Lambda(d) \Lambda\!\left(\frac{n}{d}\right) = \sum_{d\,|\,n} \mu(d) \log^2\left(\frac{n}{d}\right).$$

This variant of Selberg's identity is proved using the concept of taking derivatives of arithmetic functions defined by $f^{\prime}(n) = f(n) \cdot \log(n)$ in Section 2.18 of Apostol's book (see also this link).
