= Explicit formula =

Explicit formula can refer to:

- Closed-form expression, a mathematical expression in terms of a finite number of well-known functions
- Analytical expression, a mathematical expression in terms of a finite or infinite number of well-known functions
- Algebraic expression, a mathematical expression in terms of a finite number of algebraic operations (addition, subtraction, multiplication, division and exponentiation by a rational exponent )
- Explicit formulae (L-function), relations between sums over the complex number zeroes of an L-function and sums over prime powers
