= Legendre's constant =

Constant of proportionality of prime number density

The first 100,000 elements of the sequence a_{n} = log(n) − n/π(n) (red line) appear to converge to a value around 1.08366 (blue line).

Later elements up to 10,000,000 of the same sequence a_{n} = log(n) − n/π(n) (red line) appear to be consistently less than 1.08366 (blue line).

Legendre's constant is a mathematical constant occurring in a formula constructed by Adrien-Marie Legendre to approximate the behavior of the prime-counting function $\pi(x)$. The value that corresponds precisely to its asymptotic behavior is now known to be 1.

Examination of available numerical data for known values of $\pi(x)$ led Legendre to an approximating formula.

Legendre proposed in 1808 the formula
$$y=\frac{x}{\log(x) - 1.08366},$$
(OEIS: A228211), as giving an approximation of $y=\pi(x)$ with a "very satisfying precision".

However, if one defines the real function $B(x)$ by
$$\pi(x)=\frac{x}{\log(x) - B(x)},$$
and if $B(x)$ converges to a real constant $B$ as $x$ tends to infinity, then this constant satisfies
$$B = \lim_{x \to \infty } \left( \log(x) - {x \over \pi(x)} \right).$$

Not only is it now known that the limit exists, but also that its value is equal to 1, somewhat less than Legendre's 1.08366. Regardless of its exact value, the existence of the limit $B$ implies the prime number theorem.

Pafnuty Chebyshev proved in 1849 that if the limit B exists, it must be equal to 1. An easier proof was given by Pintz in 1980.

It is an immediate consequence of the prime number theorem, under the precise form with an explicit estimate of the error term

$$\pi(x) = \operatorname{Li} (x) + O \left(x e^{-a\sqrt{\log x}}\right) \quad\text{as } x \to \infty$$

(for some positive constant a, where O(...) is the big O notation), as proved in 1899 by Charles de La Vallée Poussin, that B indeed is equal to 1. (The prime number theorem had been proved in 1896, independently by Jacques Hadamard and La Vallée Poussin, but without any estimate of the involved error term).

Being evaluated to such a simple number has made the term Legendre's constant mostly only of historical value, with it often (technically incorrectly) being used to refer to Legendre's first guess 1.08366... instead.

== Numerical values ==
Using known values for $\pi(x)$, we can compute $B(x) = \log x - \frac{x}{\pi(x)}$ for values of $x$ far beyond what was available to Legendre:

Legendre's constant asymptotically approaching 1 for large values of $x$
x	B(x)	x	B(x)	x	B(x)	x	B(x)
10^{2}	0.605170	10^{16}	1.029660	10^{30}	1.015148	10^{44}	1.010176
10^{3}	0.955374	10^{17}	1.027758	10^{31}	1.014637	10^{45}	1.009943
10^{4}	1.073644	10^{18}	1.026085	10^{32}	1.014159	10^{46}	1.009720
10^{5}	1.087571	10^{19}	1.024603	10^{33}	1.013712	10^{47}	1.009507
10^{6}	1.076332	10^{20}	1.023281	10^{34}	1.013292	10^{48}	1.009304
10^{7}	1.070976	10^{21}	1.022094	10^{35}	1.012897	10^{49}	1.009108
10^{8}	1.063954	10^{22}	1.021022	10^{36}	1.012525	10^{50}	1.008921
10^{9}	1.056629	10^{23}	1.020050	10^{37}	1.012173	10^{51}	1.008742
10^{10}	1.050365	10^{24}	1.019164	10^{38}	1.011841	10^{52}	1.008569
10^{11}	1.045126	10^{25}	1.018353	10^{39}	1.011527	10^{53}	1.008403
10^{12}	1.040872	10^{26}	1.017607	10^{40}	1.011229	10^{54}	1.008244
10^{13}	1.037345	10^{27}	1.016921	10^{41}	1.010946	10^{55}	1.008090
10^{14}	1.034376	10^{28}	1.016285	10^{42}	1.010676	10^{56}	1.007942
10^{15}	1.031844	10^{29}	1.015696	10^{43}	1.010420	10^{57}	1.007799

Values up to $\pi(10^{29})$ (the first two columns) are known exactly; the values in the third and fourth columns are estimated using the Riemann R function.
