= 1 =

Natural number

← 0	1	2 →
- −1 0 1 2 3 4 5 6 7 8 9 →: List of numbers; Integers; ← 0 10 20 30 40 50 60 70 80 90 →
- Cardinal: one
- Ordinal: 1st (first)
- Numeral system: unary
- Factorization: ∅
- Divisors: 1
- Greek numeral: Α´
- Roman numeral: I, i
- Greek prefix: mono-/haplo-
- Latin prefix: uni-
- Binary: 1_{2}
- Ternary: 1_{3}
- Senary: 1_{6}
- Octal: 1_{8}
- Duodecimal: 1_{12}
- Hexadecimal: 1_{16}
- Greek numeral: α'
- Arabic, Kurdish, Persian, Sindhi, Urdu: ١
- Assamese & Bengali: ১
- Chinese numeral: 一/弌/壹
- Devanāgarī: १
- Santali: ᱑
- Ge'ez: ፩
- Georgian: Ⴀ/ⴀ/ა(Ani)
- Hebrew: א
- Japanese numeral: 一/壱
- Kannada: ೧
- Khmer: ១
- Armenian: Ա
- Malayalam: ൧
- Meitei: ꯱
- Thai: ๑
- Tamil: ௧
- Telugu: ೧
- Babylonian numeral: 𒐕
- Egyptian hieroglyph, Aegean numeral, Chinese counting rod: 𓏤
- Mayan numeral: •
- Morse code: . _ _ _ _
- Cyrillic numerals: А

1 (one, unit, unity) is a number, numeral, and grapheme. It is the first and smallest positive integer of the infinite sequence of natural numbers. This fundamental property has led to its unique uses in other fields, ranging from science to sports, where it commonly denotes the first, leading, or top thing in a group. 1 is the unit of counting or measurement, and represents a single thing. The representation of 1 evolved from ancient Sumerian and Babylonian symbols to the modern Arabic numeral. Linguistically, in English, "one" is a determiner for singular nouns and a gender-neutral pronoun.

In mathematics, 1 is the multiplicative identity, meaning that any number multiplied by 1 equals the same number. 1 is by convention not considered a prime number. In digital technology, 1 represents the "on" state in binary code, the foundation of computing. Philosophically, 1 symbolizes the ultimate reality or source of existence in various traditions.

== In mathematics ==
The number 1 is the first natural number after 0. Each natural number, including 1, is constructed by succession, that is, by adding 1 to the previous natural number. Although 1 meets the naïve definition of a prime number, being evenly divisible only by 1 and itself (also 1), by modern convention it is regarded as neither a prime nor a composite number.

The number 1 is the multiplicative identity of the integers, real numbers, and complex numbers, that is, any number $n$ multiplied by 1 remains unchanged $1\times n = n\times 1 = n$. As a result, the square $1^2=1$, square root $\sqrt{1} = 1$, and any other power of 1 is always equal to 1 itself. More generally, in algebra, it denotes the multiplicative identity in any unital ring or field. An element with a multiplicative inverse is called a unit, generalizing the role of 1. For any number $a$, the first power satisfies $a^1=a$, so that 1 is also the identity for any power semigroup.

1 is its own factorial $1!=1$. Moreover, the empty product, that is the product of a set of zero numbers, is also 1. Thus any number raised to the zeroth power is one, and 0! is 1.

Different mathematical constructions of the natural numbers represent 1 in various ways. In Giuseppe Peano's original formulation of the Peano axioms, a set of postulates to define the natural numbers in a precise and logical way, 1 was treated as the starting point of the sequence of natural numbers. Peano later revised his axioms to begin the sequence with 0. In the Von Neumann cardinal assignment of natural numbers, where each number is defined as a set that contains all numbers before it, 1 is represented as the singleton $\{0\}$, a set containing only the element 0. The unary numeral system, as used in tallying, is an example of a "base-1" number system, since only one mark – the tally itself – is needed. While this is the simplest way to represent the natural numbers, base-1 is rarely used as a practical base for counting due to its difficult readability.

In many mathematical and engineering problems, numeric values are typically normalized to fall within the unit interval $[0,1]$, where 1 represents the maximum possible value. For example, by definition 1 is the probability of an event that is absolutely or almost certain to occur. Likewise, vectors are often normalized into unit vectors (i.e., vectors of magnitude one), because these often have more desirable properties. Functions are often normalized by the condition that they have integral one, maximum value one, or square integral one, depending on the application.

1 is the most common leading digit in many sets of real-world numerical data. This is a consequence of Benford’s law, which states that the probability for a specific leading digit $d$ is $\log_{10} \left(\frac{d+1}{d} \right)$. The tendency for real-world numbers to grow exponentially or logarithmically biases the distribution towards smaller leading digits, with 1 occurring approximately 30% of the time.

1 is the value of Legendre's constant, introduced in 1808 by Adrien-Marie Legendre to express the asymptotic behavior of the prime-counting function. The Weil's conjecture on Tamagawa numbers states that the Tamagawa number $\tau(G)$, a geometrical measure of a connected linear algebraic group over a global number field, is 1 for all simply connected groups (those that are path-connected with no 'holes').

== As a word ==
One originates from the Old English word an, derived from the Germanic root *ainaz, from the Proto-Indo-European root *oi-no- (meaning "one, unique"). Linguistically, one is a cardinal number used for counting and expressing the number of items in a collection of things. One is most commonly a determiner used with singular countable nouns, as in one day at a time. The determiner has two senses: numerical one (I have one apple) and singulative one (one day I'll do it). One is also a gender-neutral pronoun used to refer to an unspecified person or to people in general as in one should take care of oneself.

Words that derive their meaning from one include alone, which signifies all one in the sense of being by oneself, none meaning not one, once denoting one time, and atone meaning to become at one with the someone. Combining alone with only (implying one-like) leads to lonely, conveying a sense of solitude. Other common numeral prefixes for the number 1 include uni- (e.g., unicycle, universe, unicorn), sol- (e.g., solo dance), derived from Latin, or mono- (e.g., monorail, monogamy, monopoly) derived from Greek.

== Symbols and representation ==
=== History ===
Among the earliest known records of a numeral system, is the Sumerian decimal-sexagesimal system on clay tablets dating from the first half of the third millennium BCE. Archaic Sumerian numerals for 1 and 60 both consisted of horizontal semi-circular symbols, by c. 2350 BCE, the older Sumerian curviform numerals were replaced with cuneiform symbols, with 1 and 60 both represented by the same mostly vertical symbol.

The Sumerian cuneiform system is a direct ancestor to the Eblaite and Assyro-Babylonian Semitic cuneiform decimal systems. Surviving Babylonian documents date mostly from Old Babylonian (c. 1500 BCE) and the Seleucid (c. 300 BCE) eras. The Babylonian cuneiform script notation for numbers used the same symbol for 1 and 60 as in the Sumerian system.

The most common representative glyph used in the modern Western world for the number 1 is the Arabic numeral, a vertical line, often with a serif at the top and sometimes a short horizontal line at the bottom (1). It can be traced back to the Brahmic script of ancient India, as represented by Ashoka as a simple vertical line in his Edicts of Ashoka in c. 250 BCE. This script's numeral shapes were transmitted to Europe via the Maghreb and Al-Andalus during the Middle Ages The Arabic numerals, and other glyphs used to represent the number one (e.g., Roman numeral (I ), Chinese numeral (一)) are logograms. These symbols directly represent the concept of 'one' without breaking it down into phonetic components.

=== Modern typefaces ===
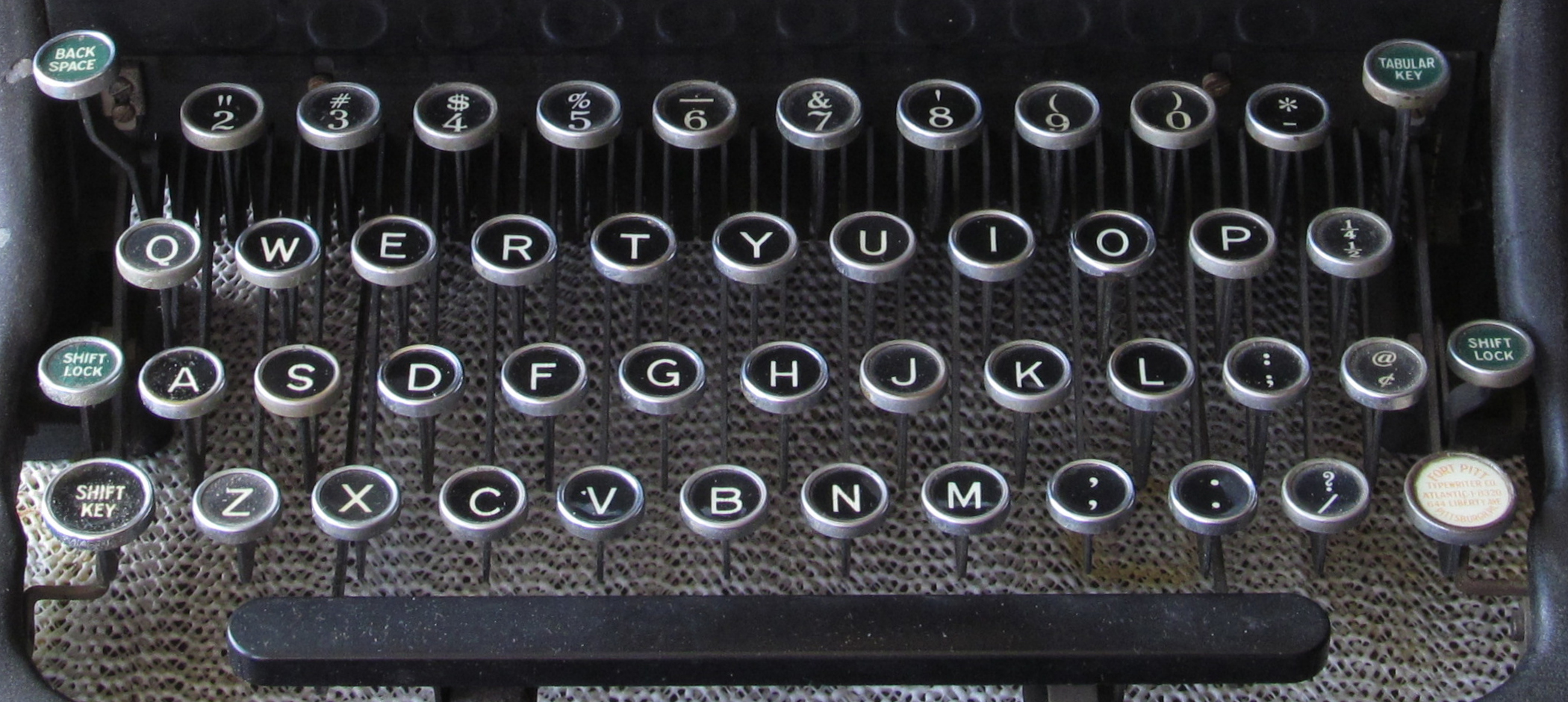
This Woodstock typewriter from the 1940s lacks a separate key for the numeral 1.

Hoefler Text, a typeface designed in 1991, uses text figures and represents the numeral 1 as similar to a small-caps I.

In modern typefaces, the shape of the character for the digit 1 is typically typeset as a lining figure with an ascender, such that the digit is the same height and width as a capital letter. However, in typefaces with text figures (also known as Old style numerals or non-lining figures), the glyph usually is of x-height and designed to follow the rhythm of the lowercase, as, for example, in . In many typefaces with text figures, the numeral 1 features parallel serifs at the top and bottom, resembling a small caps version of the Roman numeral I. Many older typewriters do not have a dedicated key for the numeral 1, requiring the use of the lowercase letter L or uppercase I as substitutes.

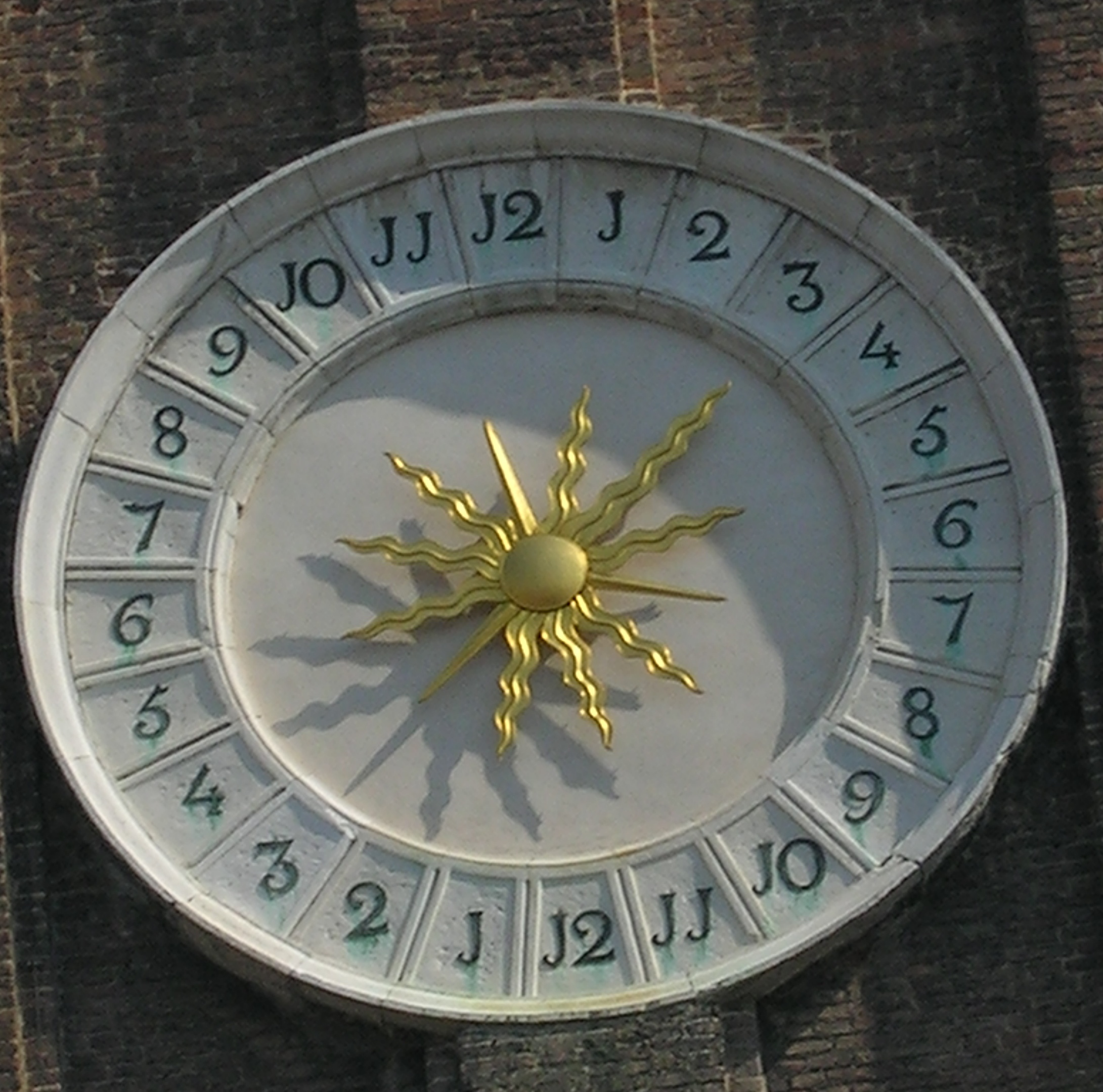
The 24-hour tower clock in Venice, using J as a symbol for 1

The lower case "j" can be considered a swash variant of a lower-case Roman numeral "i", often employed for the final i of a "lower-case" Roman numeral. It is also possible to find historic examples of the use of j or J as a substitute for the Arabic numeral 1. In German, the serif at the top may be extended into a long upstroke as long as the vertical line. This variation can lead to confusion with the glyph used for seven in other countries and so to provide a visual distinction between the two the digit 7 may be written with a horizontal stroke through the vertical line.

== In other fields ==
In digital technology, data is represented by binary code, i.e., a base-2 numeral system with numbers represented by a sequence of 1s and 0s. Digitised data is represented in physical devices, such as computers, as pulses of electricity through switching devices such as transistors or logic gates where "1" represents the value for "on". As such, the numerical value of true is equal to 1 in many programming languages. In lambda calculus and computability theory, natural numbers are represented by Church encoding as functions, where the Church numeral for 1 is represented by the function $f$ applied to an argument $x$ once (1$fx=fx$).

In physics, selected physical constants are set to 1 in natural unit systems in order to simplify the form of equations; for example, in Planck units the speed of light equals 1. Dimensionless quantities are also known as 'quantities of dimension one'. In quantum mechanics, the normalization condition for wavefunctions requires the integral of a wavefunction's squared modulus to be equal to 1. In chemistry, hydrogen, the first element of the periodic table and the most abundant element in the known universe, has an atomic number of 1. Group 1 of the periodic table consists of hydrogen and the alkali metals.

In philosophy, the number 1 is commonly regarded as a symbol of unity, often representing God or the universe in monotheistic traditions. The Pythagoreans considered the numbers to be plural and therefore did not classify 1 itself as a number, but as the origin of all numbers. In their number philosophy, where odd numbers were considered male and even numbers female, 1 was considered neutral capable of transforming even numbers to odd and vice versa by addition. The Neopythagorean philosopher Nicomachus of Gerasa's number treatise, as recovered by Boethius in the Latin translation Introduction to Arithmetic, affirmed that one is not a number, but the source of number. In the philosophy of Plotinus (and that of other neoplatonists), 'The One' is the ultimate reality and source of all existence. Philo of Alexandria (20 BC – AD 50) regarded the number one as God's number, and the basis for all numbers.

== See also ==
- −1
- 0.999... – Alternative decimal expansion of 1

== Sources ==
- Blokhintsev, D. I. (2012). Quantum Mechanics. Springer Science & Business Media. ISBN 978-9401097116.
- Caldwell, Chris K.; Xiong, Yeng (2012). "What is the smallest prime?". Journal of Integer Sequences. 15 (9, Article 12.9.7). Waterloo, CA: University of Waterloo David R. Cheriton School of Computer Science: 1–14. arXiv:1209.2007. MR 3005530. Zbl 1285.11001. Archived from the original on 2023-12-16.
- Chicago, University of (1993). The Chicago Manual of Style (14th ed.). University of Chicago Press. ISBN 0-226-10389-7.
- Chrisomalis, Stephen (2010). Numerical Notation: A Comparative History. New York: Cambridge University Press. doi:10.1017/CBO9780511676062. ISBN 978-0-521-87818-0.
- Colman, Samuel (1912). Coan, C. Arthur (ed.). Nature's Harmonic Unity: A Treatise on Its Relation to Proportional Form. New York and London: G.P. Putnam's Sons.
- Crystal, D. (2008). A Dictionary of Linguistics and Phonetics (6th ed.). Malden, MA: Wiley-Blackwell. ISBN 978-0631226642.
- Conway, John H.; Guy, Richard K. (1996). The Book of Numbers. New York: Copernicus Publications. doi:10.1007/978-1-4612-4072-3. ISBN 0614971667. Archived from the original on 2024-11-18.
- Cullen, Kristin (2007). Layout Workbook: A Real-World Guide to Building Pages in Graphic Design. Gloucester, MA: Rockport Publishers. pp. 1–240. ISBN 978-1-592-533-527.
- Emsley, John (2001). Nature's Building Blocks: An A-Z Guide to the Elements (illustrated, reprint ed.). Oxford, UK: Oxford University Press. ISBN 0198503415.
- Gaitsgory, Dennis; Lurie, Jacob (2019). Weil's Conjecture for Function Fields (Volume I). Annals of Mathematics Studies. Vol. 199. Princeton: Princeton University Press. pp. viii, 1–311. doi:10.2307/j.ctv4v32qc. ISBN 978-0-691-18213-1. MR 3887650. Zbl 1439.14006. Archived from the original on 2024-11-12.
- Glick, David; Darby, George; Marmodoro, Anna (2020). The Foundation of Reality: Fundamentality, Space, and Time. Oxford University Press. ISBN 978-0198831501.
- Guastello, Stephen J. (2023). Human Factors Engineering and Ergonomics: A Systems Approach (3rd ed.). CRC press. ISBN 978-1000822045.
- Godbole, Achyut S. (2002). Data Comms & Networks. Tata McGraw-Hill Education. ISBN 978-1-259-08223-8.
- Graham, Ronald L.; Knuth, Donald E.; Patashnik, Oren (1994). Concrete Mathematics (2 ed.). Reading, MA: Addison-Wesley. ISBN 0-201-14236-8.
- Halfwassen, Jens (2014). "The Metaphysics of the One". In Remes, Pauliina; Slaveva-Griffin, Svetla (eds.). The Routledge Handbook of Neoplatonism. Routledge Handbooks in Philosophy. Abingdon, Oxfordshire and New York: Routledge. ISBN 9781138573963.
- Halmos, Paul R. (1974). Naive Set Theory. Undergraduate Texts in Mathematics. Springer. pp. vii, 1–104. doi:10.1007/978-1-4757-1645-0. ISBN 0-387-90092-6. MR 0453532.
- Hext, Jan (1990). Programming Structures: Machines and programs. Vol. 1. Prentice Hall. p. 33. ISBN 9780724809400..
- Hindley, J. Roger; Seldin, Jonathan P. (2008). Lambda-Calculus and Combinators: An Introduction (2nd ed.). Cambridge, UK: Cambridge University Press. pp. xi, 1–358. ISBN 978-1-139-473-248. MR 2435558.
- Hodges, Andrew (2009). One to Nine: The Inner Life of Numbers. New York, NY: W. W. Norton & Company. pp. 1–330. ISBN 9780385672665. S2CID 118490841.
- Huber, Roy A.; Headrick, A. M. (1999). Handwriting Identification: Facts and Fundamentals. CRC Press. ISBN 1420048775.
- Huddleston, Rodney D.; Pullum, Geoffrey K.; Reynolds, Brett (2022). A student's Introduction to English Grammar (2nd ed.). Cambridge: Cambridge University Press. pp. 1–418. ISBN 978-1-316-51464-1. OCLC 1255524478. Archived from the original on 2024-07-12.
- Huddleston, Rodney D.; Pullum, Geoffrey K. (2002). The Cambridge grammar of the English language. Cambridge, UK; New York: Cambridge University Press. ISBN 978-0-521-43146-0.
- Hurford, James R. (1994). Grammar: A Student's Guide. Cambridge, UK: Cambridge University Press. pp. 1–288. ISBN 978-0-521-45627-2. OCLC 29702087.
- Kennedy, Hubert C. (1974). "Peano's concept of number". Historia Mathematica. 1 (4): 387–408. doi:10.1016/0315-0860(74)90031-7.
- Kottwitz, Robert E. (1988). "Tamagawa numbers". Annals of Mathematics. 2. 127 (3). Princeton, NJ: Princeton University & the Institute for Advanced Study: 629–646. doi:10.2307/2007007. JSTOR 2007007. MR 0942522.
- McWeeny, Roy (1972). Quantum Mechanics: Principles and Formalism. Dover Books on Physics (reprint ed.). Courier Corporation, 2012. ISBN 0486143805.
- Miller, Steven J., ed. (2015). Benford's law: theory and applications. Princeton, NJ: Princeton University Press. pp. xxvi, 1–438. ISBN 978-0-691-14761-1. MR 3408774. Archived from the original on 2024-07-14.
- Mills, I. M. (1995). "Unity as a Unit". Metrologia. 31 (6): 537–541. Bibcode:1995Metro..31..537M. doi:10.1088/0026-1394/31/6/013.
- Peano, Giuseppe (1889). Arithmetices principia, nova methodo exposita [The principles of arithmetic, presented by a new method]. An excerpt of the treatise where Peano first presented his axioms, and recursively defined arithmetical operations. Turin: Fratres Bocca. pp. xvi, 1–20. JFM 21.0051.02.
- Peano, Giuseppe (1908). Formulario Mathematico [Mathematical Formulary] (V ed.). Turin: Fratres Bocca. pp. xxxvi, 1–463. JFM 39.0084.01.
- Pintz, Janos (1980). "On Legendre's Prime Number Formula". The American Mathematical Monthly. 87 (9): 733–735. doi:10.2307/2321863. ISSN 0002-9890. JSTOR 2321863.
- Polt, Richard (2015). The Typewriter Revolution: A Typist's Companion for the 21st Century. The Countryman Press. ISBN 978-1581575873.
- Schubring, Gert (2008). "Processes of Algebraization". Semiotics in Mathematics Education: Epistemology, History, Classroom, and Culture. By Radford, Luis; Schubring, Gert; Seeger, Falk. Kaiser, Gabriele (ed.). Semiotic Perspectives in the Teaching and Learning of Math Series. Vol. 1. Netherlands: Sense Publishers. ISBN 978-9087905972.
- Stewart, Ian (2024). "Number Symbolism". Britannica. Archived from the original on 2008-07-26.
- Woodford, Chris (2006). Digital Technology. Evans Brothers. ISBN 978-0-237-52725-9.
