= Roger Heath-Brown =

British mathematician

Roger Heath-Brown OBE FRS
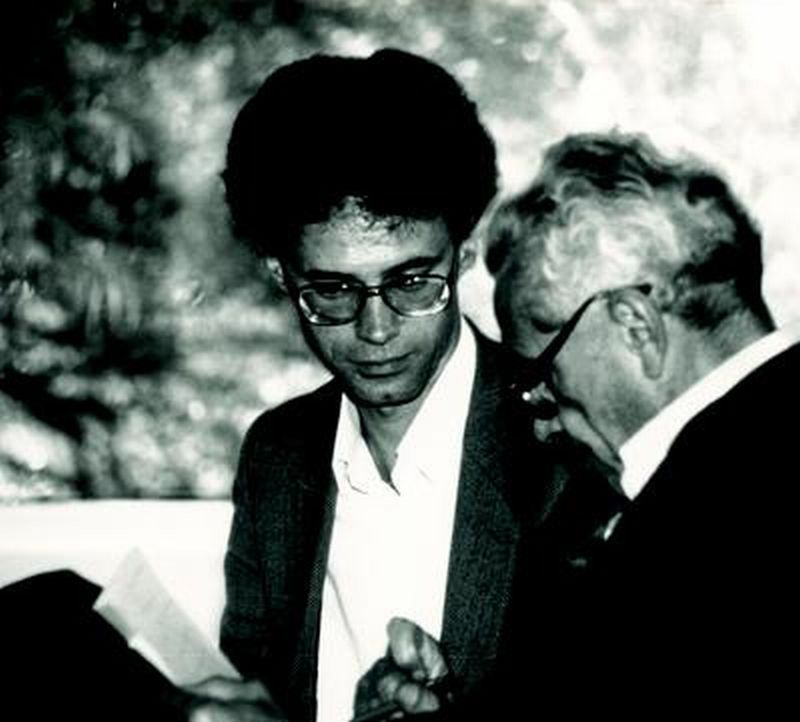
- Heath-Brown in 1986
- Born: 12 October 1952 (age 73)
- Citizenship: United Kingdom
- Education: University of Cambridge
- Known for: Analytic number theory, Heath-Brown–Moroz constant
- Awards: Smith's Prize (1976); Berwick Prize (1981); Fellow of the Royal Society (1993); Senior Berwick Prize (1996); Pólya Prize (2009); Sylvester Medal (2022)
- Scientific career
- Fields: Pure mathematics
- Workplaces: University of Oxford
- Thesis: Topics in Analytic Number Theory (1979)
- Doctoral advisor: Alan Baker
- Doctoral students: Timothy Browning; Timothy Trudgian; James Maynard
- Website: www.maths.ox.ac.uk/people/roger.heath-brown

David Rodney "Roger" Heath-Brown (born 12 October 1952) is a British mathematician working in the field of analytic number theory.

== Education ==
He was an undergraduate and graduate student of Trinity College, Cambridge; his research supervisor was Alan Baker.

== Career and research ==
In 1979 he moved to the University of Oxford, where from 1999 he held a professorship in pure mathematics. He retired in 2016.

Heath-Brown is known for many striking results. He proved that there are infinitely many prime numbers of the form x^{3} + 2y^{3}. In collaboration with S. J. Patterson in 1978 he proved the Kummer conjecture on cubic Gauss sums in its equidistribution form. He has applied Burgess's method on character sums to the ranks of elliptic curves in families. He proved that every non-singular cubic form over the rational numbers in at least ten variables represents 0. Heath-Brown also showed that Linnik's constant is less than or equal to 5.5. More recently, Heath-Brown is known for his pioneering work on the so-called determinant method. Using this method he was able to prove a conjecture of Serre in the four variable case in 2002. This particular conjecture of Serre, on the number of rational points on an integral algebraic variety, was later dubbed the "dimension growth conjecture" and was almost completely solved by various works of Browning, Heath-Brown, and Salberger by 2009.

== Honours and awards ==
The London Mathematical Society has awarded Heath-Brown the Junior Berwick Prize (1981), the Senior Berwick Prize (1996), and the Pólya Prize (2009). He was made a Fellow of the Royal Society in 1993, and a corresponding member of the Göttingen Academy of Sciences in 1999.

He was an invited speaker at International Congress of Mathematicians in 1983 in Warsaw and in 2010 in Hyderabad on the topic of "Number Theory."

In 2012 he became a fellow of the American Mathematical Society. In 2022 the Royal Society awarded him the Sylvester Medal "for his many important contributions to the study of prime numbers and solutions to equations in integers".

Heath-Brown was appointed Officer of the Order of the British Empire (OBE) in the 2024 New Year Honours for services to mathematics and mathematical research.

== Other ==
In September 2007, he co-authored (along with Joseph H. Silverman) the preface to the Oxford University Sixth Edition of the classic text An Introduction to the Theory of Numbers by G.H. Hardy and E.M. Wright.
