= Erdős–Delange theorem =

Theorem about the distribution of primes

In number theory, the Erdős–Delange theorem, named after Paul Erdős and Hubert Delange, is a theorem concerning the distribution of prime numbers.

Let $\omega(n)$ denote the number of prime factors of an integer $n$, counted with multiplicity, and $\lambda$ be any irrational number. The theorem states that the fractional parts of the numbers $\lambda\omega(n)$ are asymptotically uniformly distributed. It implies the prime number theorem.

The theorem was stated without proof in 1946 by Paul Erdős, with a remark that "the proof is not easy". Hubert Delange found a simpler proof and published it in 1958, together with two other ways of deducing it from results of Erdős and of Atle Selberg.
