= Josephine M. Mitchell =

Canadian-American mathematician and teacher

Josephine Margaret Mitchell (June 30, 1912 – December 28, 2000) was a Canadian-American mathematician specializing in the mathematical analysis of functions of several complex variables. She was the victim of a notorious case of discrimination against women in academia when, after she married another more junior faculty member at the University of Illinois Urbana-Champaign, the university used its anti-nepotism rules to revoke her tenured position while allowing her husband to keep his untenured one.

== Early life and education ==
Mitchell was born on June 30, 1912, in Edmonton, Alberta, and graduated in 1934 from the University of Alberta. She went to Bryn Mawr College for graduate study, earning a master's degree in 1941 and completing her Ph.D. in 1942. Her dissertation, On Double Sturm-Liouville Series, was supervised by Hilda Geiringer.

== Career and later life ==
In 1948, Mitchell became an assistant professor at the Oklahoma Agricultural and Mechanical College, and later the same year moved to the University of Illinois Urbana-Champaign. She was granted tenure as an associate professor in 1953, after which she married (as his second wife) the younger mathematician Lowell Schoenfeld, then an assistant professor at the same university. Under the anti-nepotism rules in place at the time, their marriage caused the university to remove her from her tenured and more senior position, while allowing Schoenfeld to keep his more junior position. Appeals to the American Association of University Professors and American Association of University Women were unsuccessful, and both Mitchell and Schoenfeld resigned from the university in protest. Less seriously, the American Mathematical Society (AMS) refused to allow newlyweds Mitchell and Schoenfeld to share accommodations at a conference organized by the society, because they used different surnames.

Mitchell held various teaching and research positions while trying to solve her and her husband's two-body problem, including a year at the Institute for Advanced Study as a Marion Talbot Fellow of the American Association of University Women, working as a researcher at General Electric Company and the Westinghouse Research Laboratory in Pittsburgh, and becoming an associate professor at the University of Pittsburgh. She and her husband obtained positions at Pennsylvania State University in 1958; unusually among American universities, Penn State took advantage of the post-war availability of women in the academic job market to strengthen its reputation by hiring many strong women faculty members. Mitchell and her husband were both promoted to full professor in 1961. She moved with her husband to the University at Buffalo in 1968, and retired in 1982.

Beyond her research, Mitchell's interests included wildflower photography and mathematical libraries. When a flood destroyed the mathematics library of Charles University in Prague, their books and journals—which were given to the AMS as a part of a bequest—were sent to help replace it.

She died on December 28, 2000, in Amherst, New York.

== Recognition ==
Mitchell was named a Fellow of the American Association for the Advancement of Science in 1953.
