= Timothy Trudgian =

Australian number theorist

- Born: Timothy Scott Trudgian; 1984 (age 41–42); Brisbane, Australia
- Education: University of Oxford; Australian National University
- Scientific career
- Fields: Mathematics
- Workplaces: Merton College, Oxford; Australian National University; University of Lethbridge; University of New South Wales
- Thesis: Further results on Gram's Law (2010)
- Doctoral advisor: Roger Heath-Brown

Timothy Trudgian is an Australian mathematician specializing in number theory and related fields. He is known for his work on Riemann zeta function, analytic number theory, and distribution of primes. He currently is a Professor at the University of New South Wales (Canberra).

== Education and Career ==
Trudgian completed his BSc (Hons) at the Australian National University in December 2005, then his Ph.D. from the University of Oxford in June 2010 under the supervision of Roger Heath-Brown. His dissertation was titled Further results on Gram's Law.

== Research ==
Trudgian has made contributions to the field of analytic number theory. His research includes work on the Riemann zeta function, the distribution of primes, and primitive roots modulo n. In joint work with Dave Platt, he verified that the Riemann hypothesis is true up to imaginary height 3 trillion. In 2024, together with Terence Tao and Andrew Yang, Trudgian published an on-going database of known theorems for various exponents appearing in analytic number theory, named Analytic Number Theory Exponent Database (ANTEDB), which could be used in the future for Lean formalization.

== Recognition ==
Trudgian is a Fellow of the Australian Mathematical Society, elected in 2023.

== Personal life ==
Trudgian is married and he has two sons.
