= Elementary proof =

Proof that only uses basic techniques

In mathematics, an elementary proof is a mathematical proof that only uses basic techniques. More specifically, the term is used in number theory to refer to proofs that make no use of complex analysis. Historically, it was once thought that certain theorems, like the prime number theorem, could only be proved by invoking "higher" mathematical theorems or techniques. However, as time progresses, many of these results have also been subsequently reproven using only elementary techniques.

While there is generally no consensus as to what counts as elementary, the term is nevertheless a common part of the mathematical jargon. An elementary proof is not necessarily simple, in the sense of being easy to understand or trivial. In fact, some elementary proofs can be quite complicated — and this is especially true when a statement of notable importance is involved.

== Prime number theorem ==
The distinction between elementary and non-elementary proofs has been considered especially important in regard to the prime number theorem. This theorem was first proved in 1896 by Jacques Hadamard and Charles Jean de la Vallée-Poussin using complex analysis. Many mathematicians then attempted to construct elementary proofs of the theorem, without success. G. H. Hardy expressed strong reservations; he considered that the essential "depth" of the result ruled out elementary proofs:

No elementary proof of the prime number theorem is known, and one may ask whether it is reasonable to expect one. Now we know that the theorem is roughly equivalent to a theorem about an analytic function, the theorem that Riemann's zeta function has no roots on a certain line. A proof of such a theorem, not fundamentally dependent on the theory of functions, seems to me extraordinarily unlikely. It is rash to assert that a mathematical theorem cannot be proved in a particular way; but one thing seems quite clear. We have certain views about the logic of the theory; we think that some theorems, as we say "lie deep" and others nearer to the surface. If anyone produces an elementary proof of the prime number theorem, he will show that these views are wrong, that the subject does not hang together in the way we have supposed, and that it is time for the books to be cast aside and for the theory to be rewritten.

— G. H. Hardy (1921). Lecture to Mathematical Society of Copenhagen. Quoted in Goldfeld (2003), p. 3

However, in 1948, Atle Selberg produced new methods which led him and Paul Erdős to find elementary proofs of the prime number theorem.

== Friedman's conjecture ==
Harvey Friedman conjectured, "Every theorem published in the Annals of Mathematics whose statement involves only finitary mathematical objects (i.e., what logicians call an arithmetical statement) can be proved in elementary arithmetic." The form of elementary arithmetic referred to in this conjecture can be formalized by a small set of axioms concerning integer arithmetic and mathematical induction. For instance, according to this conjecture, Fermat's Last Theorem should have an elementary proof; Wiles's proof of Fermat's Last Theorem is not elementary. However, there are other simple statements about arithmetic such as the existence of iterated exponential functions that cannot be proven in this theory.
