= Hans Carl Friedrich von Mangoldt =

German mathematician (1854–1925)

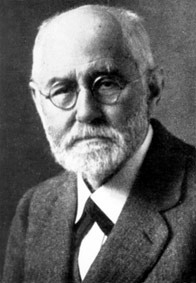
- Born: 18 May 1854; Weimar, Saxe-Weimar-Eisenach
- Died: 27 October 1925 (aged 71); Danzig-Langfuhr, Free City of Danzig
- Education: University of Berlin
- Scientific career
- Fields: Mathematics
- Doctoral advisor: Karl Weierstrass; Ernst Kummer

Hans Carl Friedrich von Mangoldt (18 May 1854 – 27 October 1925) was a German mathematician who contributed to the solution of the prime number theorem.

== Biography ==
Mangoldt completed his Doctorate of Philosophy (Ph.D) in 1878 at the University of Berlin, where his supervisors were Ernst Kummer and Karl Weierstrass. He contributed to the solution of the prime number theorem by providing rigorous proofs of two statements in Bernhard Riemann's seminal paper "On the Number of Primes Less Than a Given Magnitude". Riemann himself had only given partial proofs of these statements. Mangoldt worked as professor at the RWTH Aachen and was succeeded by Otto Blumenthal.

== See also ==
- Prime-counting function
- Cartan–Hadamard theorem
- Riemann–von Mangoldt formula
- Von Mangoldt function
