= Prime-counting function =

Function representing the number of primes less than or equal to a given number

The values of π(n) for the first 60 positive integers

In mathematics, the prime-counting function is the function counting the number of prime numbers less than or equal to some real number x. It is denoted by π(x) (unrelated to the number π).

A symmetric variant seen sometimes is π_{0}(x), which is equal to π(x) − 1/2 if x is exactly a prime number, and equal to π(x) otherwise. That is, the number of prime numbers less than x, plus half if x equals a prime.

== Growth rate ==
The first hundred thousand values of $\pi(n)$ (red) and the approximations $n / \log(n)$ (green) and $\operatorname{Li}(n)$ (blue)

Of great interest in number theory is the growth rate of the prime-counting function. It was conjectured in the end of the 18th century by Gauss and by Legendre to be approximately
$$\frac{x}{\log x}$$
where log is the natural logarithm, in the sense that
$$\lim_{x\rightarrow\infty} \frac{\pi(x)}{x/\log x}=1.$$
This statement is the prime number theorem. An equivalent statement is
$$\lim_{x\rightarrow\infty}\frac{\pi(x)}{\operatorname{li}(x)}=1$$
where li is the logarithmic integral function. The prime number theorem was first proved in 1896 by Jacques Hadamard and by Charles de la Vallée Poussin independently, using properties of the Riemann zeta function introduced by Riemann in 1859. Proofs of the prime number theorem not using the zeta function or complex analysis were found around 1948 by Atle Selberg and by Paul Erdős (for the most part independently).

=== More precise estimates ===
In 1899, de la Vallée Poussin proved that
$$\pi(x) = \operatorname{li} (x) + O \left(x e^{-a\sqrt{\log x}}\right) \quad\text{as } x \to \infty$$
for some positive constant a. Here, O(...) is the big O notation.

More precise estimates of π(x) are now known. For example, in 2002, Kevin Ford proved that
$$\pi(x) = \operatorname{li} (x) + O \left(x \exp \left( -0.2098(\log x)^{3/5} (\log \log x)^{-1/5} \right) \right).$$

Mossinghoff and Trudgian proved an explicit upper bound for the difference between π(x) and li(x):
$$\bigl| \pi(x) - \operatorname{li}(x) \bigr| \le 0.2593 \frac{x}{(\log x)^{3/4}} \exp \left( -\sqrt{ \frac{\log x}{6.315} } \right) \quad \text{for } x \ge 229.$$

For values of x that are not unreasonably large, li(x) is greater than π(x). However, π(x) − li(x) is known to change sign infinitely many times. For a discussion of this, see Skewes' number.

=== Exact form ===
For $x>1$, let $\pi_0(x)=\pi(x)-1/2$ when $x$ is prime, and let $\pi_0(x)=\pi(x)$ otherwise. Riemann's explicit formula is most naturally stated in terms of the prime-power counting function $\Pi_0(x)$. In modern notation,

$$\Pi_0(x)
=
\operatorname{li}(x)
-\sum_\rho \operatorname{li}(x^\rho)
-\log 2
+\int_x^\infty \frac{dt}{t(t^2-1)\log t},$$

where the sum is over the non-trivial zeros $\rho$ of the Riemann zeta function, taken in the usual symmetric order. Möbius inversion then yields

$$\pi_0(x)
=
\sum_{n=1}^{\infty}
\frac{\mu(n)}{n}\,
\Pi_0\!\left(x^{1/n}\right).$$

This is the form used, for example, in treatments of Riemann's prime-number formula such as Riesel and Göhl.

Writing the result instead in the frequently quoted form involving $\operatorname{R}(x^\rho)$ requires an additional interchange between the Möbius summation and the sum over the zeros of the Riemann zeta function. Since the relevant series are not absolutely convergent, this interchange does not follow from Möbius inversion alone and requires a separate justification. Its validity in this form has consequently been questioned in the literature. More recently, a preprint has claimed that, under the standard symmetric ordering of the non-trivial zeros, the corresponding partial sums are in fact unbounded.

== Table of π(x), x/(log x ), and li(x) ==
The table shows how the three functions π(x), x/(log x), and li(x) compared at powers of 10. See also, and

x	π(x)	π(x) − x/(log x)	li(x) − π(x)	x/π(x)	x/(log x) % error
10	4	0	2	2.500	−8.57%
10^{2}	25	3	5	4.000	+13.14%
10^{3}	168	23	10	5.952	+13.83%
10^{4}	1,229	143	17	8.137	+11.66%
10^{5}	9,592	906	38	10.425	+9.45%
10^{6}	78,498	6,116	130	12.739	+7.79%
10^{7}	664,579	44,158	339	15.047	+6.64%
10^{8}	5,761,455	332,774	754	17.357	+5.78%
10^{9}	50,847,534	2,592,592	1,701	19.667	+5.10%
10^{10}	455,052,511	20,758,029	3,104	21.975	+4.56%
10^{11}	4,118,054,813	169,923,159	11,588	24.283	+4.13%
10^{12}	37,607,912,018	1,416,705,193	38,263	26.590	+3.77%
10^{13}	346,065,536,839	11,992,858,452	108,971	28.896	+3.47%
10^{14}	3,204,941,750,802	102,838,308,636	314,890	31.202	+3.21%
10^{15}	29,844,570,422,669	891,604,962,452	1,052,619	33.507	+2.99%
10^{16}	279,238,341,033,925	7,804,289,844,393	3,214,632	35.812	+2.79%
10^{17}	2,623,557,157,654,233	68,883,734,693,928	7,956,589	38.116	+2.63%
10^{18}	24,739,954,287,740,860	612,483,070,893,536	21,949,555	40.420	+2.48%
10^{19}	234,057,667,276,344,607	5,481,624,169,369,961	99,877,775	42.725	+2.34%
10^{20}	2,220,819,602,560,918,840	49,347,193,044,659,702	222,744,644	45.028	+2.22%
10^{21}	21,127,269,486,018,731,928	446,579,871,578,168,707	597,394,254	47.332	+2.11%
10^{22}	201,467,286,689,315,906,290	4,060,704,006,019,620,994	1,932,355,208	49.636	+2.02%
10^{23}	1,925,320,391,606,803,968,923	37,083,513,766,578,631,309	7,250,186,216	51.939	+1.93%
10^{24}	18,435,599,767,349,200,867,866	339,996,354,713,708,049,069	17,146,907,278	54.243	+1.84%
10^{25}	176,846,309,399,143,769,411,680	3,128,516,637,843,038,351,228	55,160,980,939	56.546	+1.77%
10^{26}	1,699,246,750,872,437,141,327,603	28,883,358,936,853,188,823,261	155,891,678,121	58.850	+1.70%
10^{27}	16,352,460,426,841,680,446,427,399	267,479,615,610,131,274,163,365	508,666,658,006	61.153	+1.64%
10^{28}	157,589,269,275,973,410,412,739,598	2,484,097,167,669,186,251,622,127	1,427,745,660,374	63.456	+1.58%
10^{29}	1,520,698,109,714,272,166,094,258,063	23,130,930,737,541,725,917,951,446	4,551,193,622,464	65.759	+1.52%

Graph showing ratio of the prime-counting function π(x) to two of its approximations, x/(log x) and Li(x). As x increases (note x-axis is logarithmic), both ratios tend towards 1. The ratio for x/(log x) converges from above very slowly, while the ratio for Li(x) converges more quickly from below.

In the On-Line Encyclopedia of Integer Sequences, the π(x) column is sequence OEIS: A006880, π(x) − x/(log x) is sequence OEIS: A057835, and li(x) − π(x) is sequence OEIS: A057752.

The value for π(10^{24}) was originally computed by J. Buethe, J. Franke, A. Jost, and T. Kleinjung assuming the Riemann hypothesis. It was later verified unconditionally in a computation by D. J. Platt. The value for π(10^{25}) is by the same four authors. The value for π(10^{26}) was computed by D. B. Staple. All other prior entries in this table were also verified as part of that work.

The values for 10^{27}, 10^{28}, and 10^{29} were announced by David Baugh and Kim Walisch in 2015, 2020, and 2022, respectively.

== Algorithms for evaluating π(x) ==
A simple way to find π(x), if x is not too large, is to use the sieve of Eratosthenes to produce the primes less than or equal to x and then to count them.

A more elaborate way of finding π(x) is due to Legendre (using the inclusion–exclusion principle): given x, if p_{1}, p_{2},…, p_{n} are distinct prime numbers, then the number of integers less than or equal to x which are divisible by no p_{i} is

$$\lfloor x\rfloor - \sum_{i}\left\lfloor\frac{x}{p_i}\right\rfloor + \sum_{i<j} \left\lfloor\frac{x}{p_ip_j}\right\rfloor - \sum_{i<j<k}\left\lfloor\frac{x}{p_ip_jp_k}\right\rfloor + \cdots$$

(where ⌊x⌋ denotes the floor function). This number is therefore equal to

$$\pi(x)-\pi\left(\sqrt{x}\right)+1$$

when the numbers p_{1}, p_{2},…, p_{n} are the prime numbers less than or equal to the square root of x.

=== The Meissel–Lehmer algorithm ===
In a series of articles published between 1870 and 1885, Ernst Meissel described (and used) a practical combinatorial way of evaluating π(x): Let p_{1}, p_{2},…, p_{n} be the first n primes and denote by Φ(m,n) the number of natural numbers not greater than m which are divisible by none of the p_{i} for any i ≤ n. Then

$$\Phi(m,n)=\Phi(m,n-1)-\Phi\left(\frac m {p_n},n-1\right).$$

Given a natural number m, if n = π(^{3}√m) and if μ = π(√m) − n, then

$$\pi(m) = \Phi(m,n)+n(\mu+1)+\frac{\mu^2-\mu} 2 - 1 - \sum_{k=1}^\mu\pi\left(\frac m {p_{n+k}}\right) .$$

Using this approach, Meissel computed π(x), for x equal to 5×10^{5}, 10^{6}, 10^{7}, and 10^{8}.

In 1959, Derrick Henry Lehmer extended and simplified Meissel's method. Define, for real m and for natural numbers n and k, P_{k}(m,n) as the number of numbers not greater than m with exactly k prime factors, all greater than p_{n}. Furthermore, set P_{0}(m,n) = 1. Then

$$\Phi(m,n) = \sum_{k=0}^{+\infty} P_k(m,n)$$

where the sum actually has only finitely many nonzero terms. Let y denote an integer such that ^{3}√m ≤ y ≤ √m, and set n = π(y). Then P_{1}(m,n) = π(m) − n and P_{k}(m,n) = 0 when k ≥ 3. Therefore,

$$\pi(m) = \Phi(m,n) + n - 1 - P_2(m,n)$$

The computation of P_{2}(m,n) can be obtained this way:

$$P_2(m,n) = \sum_{y < p \le \sqrt{m} } \left( \pi \left( \frac m p \right) - \pi(p) + 1\right)$$

where the sum is over prime numbers.

On the other hand, the computation of Φ(m,n) can be done using the following rules:

1. $\Phi(m,0) = \lfloor m\rfloor$
2. $\Phi(m,b) = \Phi(m,b-1) - \Phi\left(\frac m{p_b},b-1\right)$

Using his method and an IBM 701, Lehmer was able to compute the correct value of π(10^{9}) and missed the correct value of π(10^{10}) by 1.

Further improvements to this method were made by Lagarias, Miller, Odlyzko, Deléglise, and Rivat.

== Other prime-counting functions ==
Other prime-counting functions are also used because they are more convenient to work with.

=== Riemann's prime-power counting function ===
Riemann's prime-power counting function is usually denoted as Π_{0}(x) or J_{0}(x). It has jumps of 1/n at prime powers p^{n} and it takes a value halfway between the two sides at the discontinuities of π(x). That added detail is used because the function may then be defined by an inverse Mellin transform.

Formally, we may define Π_{0}(x) by

$$\Pi_0(x) = \frac{1}{2} \left( \sum_{p^n < x} \frac{1}{n} + \sum_{p^n \le x} \frac{1}{n} \right)\$$

where the variable p in each sum ranges over all primes within the specified limits.

We may also write

$$\ \Pi_0(x) = \sum_{n=2}^x \frac{\Lambda(n)}{\log n} - \frac{\Lambda(x)}{2\log x} = \sum_{n=1}^\infty \frac 1 n \pi_0\left(x^{1/n}\right)$$

where Λ is the von Mangoldt function and

$$\pi_0(x) = \lim_{\varepsilon \to 0} \frac{\pi(x-\varepsilon) + \pi(x+\varepsilon)}{2}.$$

The Möbius inversion formula then gives

$$\pi_0(x) = \sum_{n=1}^\infty \frac{\mu(n)}{n}\ \Pi_0\left(x^{1/n}\right),$$

where μ(n) is the Möbius function.

Knowing the relationship between the logarithm of the Riemann zeta function and the von Mangoldt function Λ, and using the Perron formula we have

$$\log \zeta(s) = s \int_0^\infty \Pi_0(x) x^{-s-1}\, \mathrm{d}x$$

=== Chebyshev's function ===
The Chebyshev function weights primes or prime powers p^{n} by log p:

$$\begin{align}
\vartheta(x) &= \sum_{p\le x} \log p \\
\psi(x)&=\sum_{p^n \le x} \log p = \sum_{n=1}^\infty \vartheta \left( x^{1/n} \right) = \sum_{n \le x}\Lambda(n) .
\end{align}$$

For x ≥ 2,

$$\vartheta(x) = \pi(x)\log x - \int_2^x \frac{\pi(t)}{t}\, \mathrm{d}t$$

and

$$\pi(x)=\frac{\vartheta(x)}{\log x} + \int_2^x \frac{\vartheta(t)}{t\log^{2}(t)} \mathrm{d} t .$$

== Formulas for prime-counting functions ==
Formulas for prime-counting functions come in two kinds: arithmetic formulas and analytic formulas. Analytic formulas for prime-counting were the first used to prove the prime number theorem. They stem from the work of Riemann and von Mangoldt, and are generally known as explicit formulae.

We have the following expression for the second Chebyshev function ψ:

$$\psi_0(x) = x - \sum_\rho \frac{x^\rho}{\rho} - \log 2\pi - \frac{1}{2} \log\left(1-x^{-2}\right),$$

where

$$\psi_0(x) = \lim_{\varepsilon \to 0} \frac{\psi(x - \varepsilon) + \psi(x + \varepsilon)}{2}.$$

Here ρ are the zeros of the Riemann zeta function in the critical strip, where the real part of ρ is between zero and one. The formula is valid for values of x greater than one, which is the region of interest. The sum over the roots is conditionally convergent, and should be taken in order of increasing absolute value of the imaginary part. Note that the same sum over the trivial roots gives the last subtrahend in the formula.

For Π_{0}(x) we have a more complicated formula

$$\Pi_0(x) = \operatorname{li}(x) - \sum_\rho \operatorname{li}\left(x^\rho\right) - \log 2 + \int_x^\infty \frac{\mathrm{d}t}{t \left(t^2 - 1\right) \log t}.$$

Again, the formula is valid for x > 1, while ρ are the nontrivial zeros of the zeta function ordered according to their absolute value. The first term li(x) is the usual logarithmic integral function; the expression li(x^{ρ}) in the second term should be considered as Ei(ρ log x), where Ei is the analytic continuation of the exponential integral function from negative reals to the complex plane with branch cut along the positive reals. The final integral is equal to the series over the trivial zeros:

$$\int_x^\infty \frac{\mathrm dt}{t \left(t^2 - 1\right) \log t}=\int_x^\infty \frac{1}{t\log t}
\left(\sum_{m}t^{-2m}\right)\,\mathrm dt=\sum_{m}\int_x^\infty \frac{t^{-2m}}{t\log t}
\,\mathrm dt \,\,\overset{\left(u=t^{-2m}\right)}{=}-\sum_{m} \operatorname{li}\left(x^{-2m}\right)$$

Applying Möbius inversion to the explicit formula for $\Pi_0$ gives

$$\pi_0(x)
=
\sum_{n=1}^{\infty}
\frac{\mu(n)}{n}\,
\Pi_0\!\left(x^{1/n}\right).$$

Introducing Riemann's $R$-function,

$$\operatorname{R}(x)
=
\sum_{n=1}^{\infty}
\frac{\mu(n)}{n}
\operatorname{li}\!\left(x^{1/n}\right),$$

and formally interchanging the Möbius summation with the sums over the non-trivial and trivial zeros leads to the commonly quoted expression

$$\operatorname{R}(x)
-\sum_\rho \operatorname{R}(x^\rho)
-\sum_{m=1}^{\infty}\operatorname{R}(x^{-2m}).$$

As noted above, this rearrangement would require an additional justification and cannot be a consequence of Möbius inversion alone. In fact, more recently it has shown that, with the standard symmetric ordering of the non-trivial zeros, the partial sums $\sum_{|\operatorname{Im}\rho|\leq T} \operatorname{R}(x^\rho)$ are unbounded for every fixed $x>1$, and that the corresponding series over the trivial zeros is likewise divergent.

Folkmar Bornemann proved, when assuming the conjecture that all zeros of the Riemann zeta function are simple, (Note: Montgomery showed that (assuming the Riemann hypothesis) at least two thirds of all zeros are simple.) that

$$\operatorname{R}\left(e^{-2\pi t}\right)=\frac{1}{\pi}\sum_{k=1}^\infty\frac{(-1)^{k-1}t^{-2k-1}}{(2k+1)\zeta(2k+1)}+\frac12\sum_{\rho}\frac{t^{-\rho}}{\rho\cos\frac{\pi\rho}{2}\zeta'(\rho)}$$

where ρ runs over the non-trivial zeros of the Riemann zeta function and t > 0.

The Riemann $R$-function itself provides a very good smooth approximation to the prime-counting function. Riesel and Göhl considered the refined approximation

$$g(x)
=
\operatorname{R}(x)
-\frac{1}{\log x}
+\frac{1}{\pi}\arctan\frac{\pi}{\log x},$$

which differs from $\operatorname{R}(x)$ by a term tending to zero as $x\to\infty$. The difference between $\pi_0(x)$ and this smooth approximation is heuristically expected to have size about $\sqrt{x}/\log x$. This motivates representing the fluctuations in the distribution of primes by

$$\Delta(x)
=
\left(
\pi_0(x)
-\operatorname{R}(x)
+\frac{1}{\log x}
-\frac{1}{\pi}\arctan\frac{\pi}{\log x}
\right)
\frac{\log x}{\sqrt{x}}.$$

As explained above, the formally rearranged expression $\sum_{m=1}^{\infty}\operatorname{R}(x^{-2m})$ should not be identified with the smooth correction.

== Inequalities ==
Ramanujan proved that the inequality

$$\pi(x)^2 < \frac{ex}{\log x} \pi\left( \frac{x}{e} \right)$$

holds for all sufficiently large values of x.

Here are some useful inequalities for π(x).

$$\frac x {\log x} < \pi(x) < 1.25506 \frac x {\log x} \quad \text{for }x \ge 17.$$

The left inequality holds for x ≥ 17 and the right inequality holds for x > 1. The constant 1.25506 is 30 (log 113)/113 to 5 decimal places, as π(x) (log x)/x has its maximum value at x = p_{30} = 113.

Pierre Dusart proved in 2010:

$$\frac {x} {\log x - 1} < \pi(x) < \frac {x} {\log x - 1.1}\quad \text{for }x \ge 5393 \text{ and }x \ge 60184,\text{ respectively.}$$

More recently, Dusart has proved (Theorem 5.1) that

$$\frac{x}{\log x} \left( 1 + \frac{1}{\log x} + \frac{2}{\log^2 x} \right) \le \pi(x) \le \frac{x}{\log x} \left( 1 + \frac{1}{\log x} + \frac{2}{\log^2 x} + \frac{7.59}{\log^3 x} \right),$$

for x ≥ 88783 and x > 1, respectively.

Another inequality is based on a different asymptotic expansion by Panaitopol

$$\frac{x}{\pi(x)} = \log x - 1 - \sum_{i=1}^m \frac{k_m}{(\log x)^m} + O\left((\log x)^{-m-1}\right)$$

where the k_{i} = 1, 3, 13, 71, 461, 3441, ... are defined by

$$\sum_{i=1}^m (m-i)!\;k_i = m\cdot m!.$$

Axler (2024) adapted these into a lower bound on π(x)

$$\log x - 1 - \frac1{\log x} - \frac3{(\log x)^2} > \frac x{\pi(x)}\quad(\text{for }x \geq 65\,405\,887),$$

and an upper bound on π(x) (a lower bound on x/π(x)) defined by k_{1}=1, k_{2}=2.975666, k_{3}=13.024334, k_{4}=70.951332, k_{5}=461.364417856444 and k_{6}=4331.1, which applies for all x ≥ 48.

Going in the other direction, an approximation for the nth prime, p_{n}, is

$$\begin{align}
p_n = n \Bigg(&\log n + \log\log n - 1 + \frac {\log\log n - 2}{\log n}\\
&- \frac {(\log\log n)^2 - 6\log\log n +11}{2 (\log n)^2}
+ O\left( \frac {(\log\log n)^3} {(\log n)^3}\right) \Bigg).
\end{align}$$

The nth prime can be bounded by

$$\begin{align}
n \log n <\; &p_n < n (\log n + \log\log n) = n \log (n \log n)&&\text{for } n \ge 6,\\
n (\log n + \log\log n - 1) <\; &p_n < n (\log n + \log\log n - 0.5)&&\text{for } n \ge 20, \\
&p_n < n (\log n + \log\log n - 0.9487)&&\text{for } n \ge 39017.
\end{align}$$

The first lower bound (Rosser (1962)) holds for all n ≥ 1, and the first upper bound (Rosser (1941), Rosser (1962)) holds for n ≥ 6. The second lower bound (Dusart (1999)) holds for n ≥ 2, and is tighter than the first for n > e^{e} ≈15.154. The second upper bound (Rosser (1962)) holds for n ≥ 20. The third is also due to Dusart.

In 2010 Dusart proved (Propositions 6.7 and 6.6) that

$$\begin{align}
& n \left( \log n + \log \log n - 1 + \frac{\log \log n - 2.1}{\log n} \right) \le p_n\quad\text{(for } n \geq 3\text{), and}\\
p_n \le\; & n \left( \log n + \log \log n - 1 + \frac{\log \log n - 2}{\log n} \right)\quad\text{(for } n \geq 688383).
\end{align}$$

In 2024, Axler further tightened this (equations 1.12 and 1.13) using bounds of the form

$$f(n,g(w)) = n \left( \log n + \log\log n - 1 + \frac{\log\log n - 2}{\log n} - \frac{g(\log\log n)}{2\log^2 n} \right)$$

proving that

$$f(n, w^2 - 6w + 11.321) \le p_n \le f(n, w^2 - 6w)$$

for n ≥ 2 and n ≥ 3468, respectively. The lower bound may also be simplified to f(n, w^{2}) without altering its validity. The upper bound may be tightened to f(n, w^{2} − 6w + 10.667) if n ≥ 46254381.

There are additional bounds of varying complexity.

== The Riemann hypothesis ==
Let $b$ be the supremum of the real parts of all zeroes of the Riemann zeta function. Then

$$\pi(x) = \operatorname{li}(x) + O(x^b \log x).$$

The least possible value of $b$ is $1/2$; the Riemann hypothesis is the claim that this is the true value. The resulting bound would then be

$$\pi(x) = \operatorname{li}(x) + O(\sqrt{x} \log{x}).$$

Specifically,

$$|\pi(x) - \operatorname{li}(x)| < \frac{\sqrt{x}}{8\pi} \, \log{x}, \quad \text{for all } x \ge 2657.$$

Dudek (2015) proved that the Riemann hypothesis implies that for all x ≥ 2 there is a prime p satisfying

$$x - \frac{4}{\pi} \sqrt{x} \log x < p \leq x.$$

== See also ==
- Bertrand's postulate
- Oppermann's conjecture
- Ramanujan prime
