= Logarithmic integral function =

Special function defined by an integral

Plot of the absolute value of the logarithmic integral function li(z) in the complex plane from −2−2i to 2+2i with colors showing the argument (the angle around the complex plane)

In mathematics, the logarithmic integral function or integral logarithm li(x) is a special function. It is relevant in problems of physics and has number theoretic significance. In particular, according to the prime number theorem, it is a very good approximation to the prime-counting function, which is defined as the number of prime numbers less than or equal to a given value x.

Logarithmic integral function plot

== Integral representation ==
The logarithmic integral has an integral representation defined for all positive real numbers x ≠ 1 by the definite integral

$$\operatorname{li}(x) = \int_0^x \frac{dt}{\ln t}.$$

Here, ln denotes the natural logarithm. The function 1/(ln t) has a singularity at t = 1, and the integral for x > 1 is interpreted as a Cauchy principal value,

$$\operatorname{li}(x) = \lim_{\varepsilon \to 0+} \left( \int_0^{1-\varepsilon} \frac{dt}{\ln t} + \int_{1+\varepsilon}^x \frac{dt}{\ln t} \right).$$

However, the logarithmic integral can also be taken to be a meromorphic complex-valued function in the complex domain. In this case it is multi-valued with branch points at 0 and 1, and the values between 0 and 1 defined by the above integral are not compatible with the values beyond 1. The complex function is shown in the figure above. The values on the real axis beyond 1 are the same as defined above, but the values between 0 and 1 are offset by iπ so that the absolute value at 0 is π rather than zero. The complex function is also defined (but multi-valued) for numbers with negative real part, but on the negative real axis the values are not real.

== Offset logarithmic integral ==
The offset logarithmic integral or Eulerian logarithmic integral is defined as

$$\operatorname{Li}(x) = \int_2^x \frac{dt}{\ln t} = \operatorname{li}(x) - \operatorname{li}(2).$$

As such, the integral representation has the advantage of avoiding the singularity in the domain of integration.

Equivalently,

$$\operatorname{li}(x) = \int_0^x \frac{dt}{\ln t} = \operatorname{Li}(x) + \operatorname{li}(2).$$

== Special values ==
The function li(x) has a single positive zero; it occurs at x ≈ 1.45136 92348 83381 05028 39684 85892 02744 94930... OEIS: A070769; this number is known as the Ramanujan–Soldner constant.

$\operatorname{li}(\text{Li}^{-1}(0)) = \text{li}(2)$ ≈ 1.045163 780117 492784 844588 889194 613136 522615 578151... OEIS: A069284

This is $-(\Gamma(0,-\ln 2) + i\,\pi)$ where $\Gamma(a,x)$ is the incomplete gamma function. It must be understood as the Cauchy principal value of the function.

== Series representation ==
The function li(x) is related to the exponential integral Ei(x) via the equation

$$\operatorname{li}(x)=\hbox{Ei}(\ln x) ,$$

which is valid for x > 0. This identity provides a series representation of li(x) as

$$\operatorname{li}(e^u) = \hbox{Ei}(u) =
\gamma + \ln |u| + \sum_{n=1}^\infty {u^{n}\over n \cdot n!}
\quad \text{ for } u \ne 0 \, ,$$

where γ ≈ 0.57721 56649 01532 ... OEIS: A001620 is the Euler–Mascheroni constant. For the complex function the formula is

$$\operatorname{li}(e^u) = \hbox{Ei}(u) =
\gamma + \ln u + \sum_{n=1}^\infty {u^{n}\over n \cdot n!}
\quad \text{ for } u \ne 0 \, ,$$

(without taking the absolute value of u). A more rapidly convergent series by Ramanujan is

$$\operatorname{li}(x) =
\gamma
+ \ln |\ln x|
+ \sqrt{x} \sum_{n=1}^\infty
\left( \frac{ (-1)^{n-1} (\ln x)^n}  {n! \, 2^{n-1}}
\sum_{k=0}^{\lfloor (n-1)/2 \rfloor} \frac{1}{2k+1} \right).$$

Again, for the meromorphic complex function the term $\ln|\ln u|$ must be replaced by $\ln\ln u.$

== Asymptotic expansion ==
The asymptotic behavior both for $x\to\infty$ and for $x\to 0^+$ is

$$\operatorname{li}(x) = O \left( \frac{x }{\ln x} \right) .$$

where $O$ is the big O notation. The full asymptotic expansion is

$$\operatorname{li}(x) \sim \frac{x}{\ln x} \sum_{k=0}^\infty \frac{k!}{(\ln x)^k}$$

or

$$\frac{\operatorname{li}(x)}{x/\ln x}  \sim  1 + \frac{1}{\ln x} + \frac{2}{(\ln x)^2} + \frac{6}{(\ln x)^3} + \cdots.$$

This gives the following more accurate asymptotic behaviour:

$$\operatorname{li}(x) - \frac{x}{ \ln x} = O \left( \frac{x}{(\ln x)^2} \right) .$$

As an asymptotic expansion, this series is not convergent: it is a reasonable approximation only if the series is truncated at a finite number of terms, and only large values of x are employed. This expansion follows directly from the asymptotic expansion for the exponential integral.

This implies e.g. that we can bracket li as:

$$1+\frac{1}{\ln x} < \operatorname{li}(x) \frac{\ln x}{x} < 1+\frac{1}{\ln x}+\frac{3}{(\ln x)^2}$$

for all $\ln x \ge 11$.

== Number theoretic significance ==
The logarithmic integral is important in number theory, appearing in estimates of the number of prime numbers less than a given value. For example, the prime number theorem states that:

$$\pi(x)\sim\operatorname{li}(x)$$

where $\pi(x)$ is the prime-counting function giving the number of primes less than or equal to $x.$

Assuming the Riemann hypothesis, we get the even stronger:

$$|\operatorname{li}(x)-\pi(x)| = O(\sqrt{x}\log x)$$

In fact, the Riemann hypothesis is equivalent to the statement that:

$|\operatorname{li}(x)-\pi(x)| = O(x^{1/2+a})$ for any $a>0$.

For small $x$, $\operatorname{li}(x)>\pi(x)$ but the difference changes sign an infinite number of times as $x$ increases; the first time that this happens is believed to be close to the known upper bound of 1.3984×10^{316}, although the only proved lower bound is 10^{19}.

== See also ==
- Jørgen Pedersen Gram
- Skewes' number
- List of integrals of logarithmic functions
