= Von Mangoldt function =

Function on an integer n which is log(p) if n equals p^k and zero otherwise

In mathematics, the von Mangoldt function is an arithmetic function named after German mathematician Hans von Mangoldt. It is an example of an important arithmetic function that is neither multiplicative nor additive.

== Definition ==
The von Mangoldt function, denoted by $\Lambda(n)$, is defined as

$$\Lambda(n) = \begin{cases} \log p & \text{if }n=p^k \text{ for some prime } p \text{ and integer } k \ge 1, \\ 0 & \text{otherwise.} \end{cases}$$

The first few values of $\Lambda(n)$ are

$$0 , \log 2 , \log 3 , \log 2 , \log 5 , 0 , \log 7 , \log 2 , \log 3, 0, \log 11, 0,\dots$$

which is related to (sequence A014963 in the OEIS).

== Properties ==
The von Mangoldt function satisfies the identity

$$\log(n) = \sum_{d \mid n} \Lambda(d).$$

The sum is taken over all integers d that divide n. This is proved by the fundamental theorem of arithmetic, since the terms that are not powers of primes are equal to 0. For example, consider the case n = 12 = 2^{2} × 3. Then

$$\begin{align}
\sum_{d \mid 12} \Lambda(d) &= \Lambda(1) + \Lambda(2) + \Lambda(3) + \Lambda(4) + \Lambda(6) + \Lambda(12) \\
&= \Lambda(1) + \Lambda(2) + \Lambda(3) + \Lambda \left (2^2 \right ) + \Lambda(2 \times 3) + \Lambda \left (2^2 \times 3 \right) \\
&= 0 + \log(2) + \log(3) + \log(2) + 0 + 0 \\
&=\log (2 \times 3 \times 2) \\
&= \log(12).
\end{align}$$

By Möbius inversion, we have

$$\Lambda (n) = \sum_{d \mid n} \mu(d) \log\left(\frac{n}{d}\right)$$

where $\mu(d)$ is the Möbius function. Then by using the product rule for the logarithm we get

$$\Lambda (n) = - \sum_{d \mid n} \mu(d) \log(d) \ .$$

For all $x\ge 1$, we have

$$\sum_{n\le x}\frac{\Lambda(n)}{n}=\log x+O(1).$$

Also, there exist positive constants c_{1} and c_{2} such that

$$\psi(x)\le c_1x,$$

for all $x\ge 1$, and

$$\psi(x)\ge c_2x,$$

for all sufficiently large x.

== Dirichlet series ==
The von Mangoldt function plays an important role in the theory of Dirichlet series, and in particular, the Riemann zeta function. For example, one has

$$\log \zeta(s)=\sum_{n=2}^\infty \frac{\Lambda(n)}{\log(n)}\,\frac{1}{n^s}, \qquad \text{Re}(s) > 1.$$

The logarithmic derivative is then

$$\frac {\zeta^\prime(s)}{\zeta(s)} = -\sum_{n=1}^\infty \frac{\Lambda(n)}{n^s}.$$

These are special cases of a more general relation on Dirichlet series. If one has

$$F(s) =\sum_{n=1}^\infty \frac{f(n)}{n^s}$$

for a completely multiplicative function f(n), and the series converges for Re(s) > σ_{0}, then

$$\frac {F^\prime(s)}{F(s)} = - \sum_{n=1}^\infty \frac{f(n)\Lambda(n)}{n^s}$$

converges for Re(s) > σ_{0}.

== Chebyshev function ==
The second Chebyshev function $\psi(x)$ is the summatory function of the von Mangoldt function:

$$\psi(x) = \sum_{p^k\le x}\log p=\sum_{n \leq x} \Lambda(n) \ .$$

It was introduced by Pafnuty Chebyshev who used it to show that the true order of the prime counting function $\pi(x)$ is $x/\log x$. Von Mangoldt provided a rigorous proof of an explicit formula for $\psi(x)$ involving a sum over the non-trivial zeros of the Riemann zeta function. This was an important part of the first proof of the prime number theorem.

The Mellin transform of the Chebyshev function can be found by applying Perron's formula:

$$\frac{\zeta^\prime(s)}{\zeta(s)} = - s\int_1^\infty \frac{\psi(x)}{x^{s+1}}\,dx$$

which holds for $\operatorname{Re}(s)>1$.

== Exponential series ==

Hardy and Littlewood examined the series

$$F(y)=\sum_{n=2}^\infty \left(\Lambda(n)-1\right) e^{-ny}$$

in the limit y → 0^{+}. Assuming the Riemann hypothesis, they demonstrate that

$$F(y)=O\left(\frac{1}{\sqrt{y}}\right)\quad \text{and}\quad F(y)=\Omega_\pm\left(\frac{1}{\sqrt{y}}\right)$$

In particular this function is oscillatory with diverging oscillations: there exists a value K > 0 such that both inequalities

$$F(y)< -\frac{K}{\sqrt{y}}, \quad \text{ and } \quad F(z)> \frac{K}{\sqrt{z}}$$

hold infinitely often in any neighbourhood of 0. The graphic to the right indicates that this behaviour is not at first numerically obvious: the oscillations are not clearly seen until the series is summed in excess of 100 million terms, and are only readily visible when y < 10^{−5}.

== Riesz mean ==
The Riesz mean of the von Mangoldt function is given by

$$\begin{align}
\sum_{n\le \lambda} \left(1-\frac{n}{\lambda}\right)^\delta \Lambda(n) &= -\frac{1}{2\pi i} \int_{c-i\infty}^{c+i\infty}
\frac{\Gamma(1+\delta)\Gamma(s)}{\Gamma(1+\delta+s)} \frac{\zeta^\prime(s)}{\zeta(s)} \lambda^s ds \\
&= \frac{\lambda}{1+\delta} + \sum_\rho \frac{\Gamma(1+\delta)\Gamma(\rho)}{\Gamma(1+\delta+\rho)} + \sum_n c_n \lambda^{-n}.
\end{align}$$

Here, λ and δ are numbers characterizing the Riesz mean. One must take c > 1. The sum over ρ is the sum over the zeroes of the Riemann zeta function, and

$$\sum_n c_n \lambda^{-n}\,$$

can be shown to be a convergent series for λ > 1.

== Approximation by Riemann zeta zeros ==
The first Riemann zeta zero wave in the sum that approximates the von Mangoldt function

There is an explicit formula for the summatory Mangoldt function $\psi(x)$ given by

$$\psi(x)=x-\sum_{\zeta(\rho)=0}\frac{x^\rho}\rho -\log(2\pi).$$

If we separate out the trivial zeros of the zeta function, which are the negative even integers, we obtain

$$\psi(x)=x-\sum_{\zeta(\rho)=0,\ 0<\Re(\rho)<1}\frac{x^\rho}\rho -\log(2\pi)-\frac12\log(1-x^{-2}).$$

(The sum is not absolutely convergent, so we take the zeros in order of the absolute value of their imaginary part.)

In the opposite direction, in 1911 E. Landau proved that for any fixed t > 1

$$\sum_{0<\gamma \leq T} t^\rho=\frac{-T}{2 \pi} \Lambda(t)+\mathcal{O}(\log T)$$

(We use the notation ρ = β + iγ for the non-trivial zeros of the zeta function.)

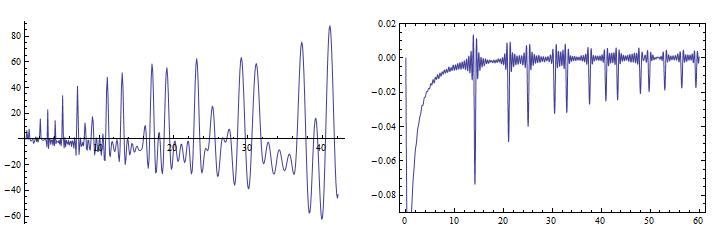
(Left) The von Mangoldt function, approximated by zeta zero waves.(Right) The Fourier transform of the von Mangoldt function gives a spectrum with imaginary parts of Riemann zeta zeros as spikes.

Therefore, if we use Riemann notation α = −i(ρ − 1/2) we have that the sum over nontrivial zeta zeros expressed as

$$\lim _{T \rightarrow+\infty} \frac{1}{T} \sum_{0<\gamma \leq T} \cos (\alpha \log t)=-\frac{\Lambda(t)}{2 \pi \sqrt{t}}$$

peaks at primes and powers of primes.

The Fourier transform of the von Mangoldt function gives a spectrum with spikes at ordinates equal to the imaginary parts of the Riemann zeta function zeros. This is sometimes called a duality.

== Generalized von Mangoldt function ==
The functions

$$\Lambda_k(n)=\sum\limits_{d\mid n}\mu(d)\log^k(n/d),$$

where $\mu$ denotes the Möbius function and $k$ denotes a positive integer, generalize the von Mangoldt function. The function $\Lambda_1$ is the ordinary von Mangoldt function $\Lambda$.

== See also ==
- Prime-counting function
