= Pierre Dusart =

French mathematician

Pierre Dusart is a French mathematician at the Université de Limoges who specializes in number theory.

He has published in several countries, specially in South Korea, with his colleague Damien Sauveron who is associate professor in Computer Sciences at the Université de Limoges.
