= List of number theory topics =

This is a list of topics in number theory. See also:

- List of recreational number theory topics
- Topics in cryptography

== Divisibility rule ==
- Composite number
  - Highly composite number
- Even and odd numbers
  - Parity
- Divisor, aliquot part
  - Greatest common divisor
  - Least common multiple
  - Euclidean algorithm
  - Coprime
  - Euclid's lemma
  - Bézout's identity, Bézout's lemma
  - Extended Euclidean algorithm
  - Table of divisors
- Prime number, prime power
  - Bonse's inequality
- Prime factor
  - Table of prime factors
- Formula for primes
- Factorization
  - RSA number
- Fundamental theorem of arithmetic
- Square-free
  - Square-free integer
  - Square-free polynomial
- Square number
- Power of two
- Integer-valued polynomial

== Fractions ==
- Rational number
- Unit fraction
- Irreducible fraction = in lowest terms
- Dyadic fraction
- Recurring decimal
- Cyclic number
- Farey sequence
  - Ford circle
  - Stern–Brocot tree
- Dedekind sum
- Egyptian fraction

== Modular arithmetic ==
- Montgomery reduction
- Modular exponentiation
- Linear congruence theorem
- Successive over-relaxation
- Chinese remainder theorem
- Fermat's little theorem
  - Proofs of Fermat's little theorem
- Fermat quotient
- Euler's totient function
  - Noncototient
  - Nontotient
- Euler's theorem
- Wilson's theorem
- Primitive root modulo n
  - Multiplicative order
  - Discrete logarithm
- Quadratic residue
  - Euler's criterion
  - Legendre symbol
  - Gauss's lemma (number theory)
- Congruence of squares
- Luhn formula
- Mod n cryptanalysis

== Arithmetic functions ==
- Multiplicative function
- Additive function
- Dirichlet convolution
- Erdős–Kac theorem
- Möbius function
  - Möbius inversion formula
- Divisor function
- Liouville function
- Partition function (number theory)
  - Integer partition
  - Bell numbers
  - Landau's function
  - Pentagonal number theorem
- Bell series
- Lambert series

== Analytic number theory: additive problems ==
- Twin prime
  - Brun's constant
- Cousin prime
- Prime triplet
- Prime quadruplet
- Sexy prime
- Sophie Germain prime
- Cunningham chain
- Goldbach's conjecture
  - Goldbach's weak conjecture
- Second Hardy–Littlewood conjecture
- Hardy–Littlewood circle method
- Schinzel's hypothesis H
- Bateman–Horn conjecture
- Waring's problem
  - Brahmagupta–Fibonacci identity
  - Euler's four-square identity
  - Lagrange's four-square theorem
  - Taxicab number
  - Generalized taxicab number
- Cabtaxi number
- Schnirelmann density
- Sumset
- Landau–Ramanujan constant
- Sierpinski number
  - Seventeen or Bust
- Niven's constant

== Algebraic number theory ==
See list of algebraic number theory topics

== Quadratic forms ==
- Unimodular lattice
- Fermat's theorem on sums of two squares
  - Proofs of Fermat's theorem on sums of two squares

== L-functions ==
- Riemann zeta function
  - Basel problem on ζ(2)
  - Hurwitz zeta function
  - Bernoulli number
    - Agoh–Giuga conjecture
    - Von Staudt–Clausen theorem
- Dirichlet series
- Euler product
- Prime number theorem
  - Prime-counting function
    - Meissel–Lehmer algorithm
  - Offset logarithmic integral
  - Legendre's constant
  - Skewes' number
  - Bertrand's postulate
    - Proof of Bertrand's postulate
    - Proof that the sum of the reciprocals of the primes diverges
  - Cramér's conjecture
- Riemann hypothesis
  - Critical line theorem
  - Hilbert–Pólya conjecture
  - Generalized Riemann hypothesis
  - Mertens function, Mertens conjecture, Meissel–Mertens constant
  - De Bruijn–Newman constant
- Dirichlet character
- Dirichlet L-series
  - Siegel zero
- Dirichlet's theorem on arithmetic progressions
  - Linnik's theorem
  - Elliott–Halberstam conjecture
- Functional equation (L-function)
- Chebotarev's density theorem
- Local zeta function
  - Weil conjectures
- Modular form
  - modular group
  - Congruence subgroup
  - Hecke operator
  - Cusp form
  - Eisenstein series
  - Modular curve
  - Ramanujan–Petersson conjecture
- Birch and Swinnerton-Dyer conjecture
- Automorphic form
- Selberg trace formula
- Artin conjecture
- Sato–Tate conjecture
- Langlands program
- modularity theorem

== Diophantine equations ==
- Pythagorean triple
- Pell's equation
- Elliptic curve
  - Nagell–Lutz theorem
  - Mordell–Weil theorem
  - Mazur's torsion theorem
  - Congruent number
  - Arithmetic of abelian varieties
  - Elliptic divisibility sequences
  - Mordell curve
- Fermat's Last Theorem
- Mordell conjecture
- Euler's sum of powers conjecture
- abc Conjecture
- Catalan's conjecture
- Pillai's conjecture
- Hasse principle
- Diophantine set
- Matiyasevich's theorem
- Hundred Fowls Problem
- 1729

== Diophantine approximation ==
- Davenport–Schmidt theorem
- Irrational number
  - Square root of two
  - Quadratic irrational
  - Integer square root
  - Algebraic number
    - Pisot–Vijayaraghavan number
    - Salem number
  - Transcendental number
    - e (mathematical constant)
    - pi, list of topics related to pi
    - Squaring the circle
    - Proof that e is irrational
    - Lindemann–Weierstrass theorem
    - Hilbert's seventh problem
    - Gelfond–Schneider theorem
  - Erdős–Borwein constant
- Liouville number
- Irrationality measure
- Simple continued fraction
  - Mathematical constant (sorted by continued fraction representation)
  - Khinchin's constant
  - Lévy's constant
  - Lochs' theorem
  - Gauss–Kuzmin–Wirsing operator
  - Minkowski's question mark function
  - Generalized continued fraction
- Kronecker's theorem
- Thue–Siegel–Roth theorem
- Prouhet–Thue–Morse constant
- Gelfond–Schneider constant
- Equidistribution mod 1
- Beatty's theorem
- Littlewood conjecture
- Discrepancy function
  - Low-discrepancy sequence
  - Illustration of a low-discrepancy sequence
  - Constructions of low-discrepancy sequences
  - Halton sequences
- Geometry of numbers
  - Minkowski's theorem
  - Pick's theorem
  - Mahler's compactness theorem
- Mahler measure
- Effective results in number theory
- Mahler's theorem

== Sieve methods ==
- Brun sieve
- Function field sieve
- General number field sieve
- Large sieve
- Larger sieve
- Quadratic sieve
- Selberg sieve
- Sieve of Atkin
- Sieve of Eratosthenes
- Sieve of Sundaram
- Turán sieve

== Named primes ==
- Chen prime
- Cullen prime
- Fermat prime
- Sophie Germain prime, safe prime
- Mersenne prime
  - New Mersenne conjecture
  - Great Internet Mersenne Prime Search
- Newman–Shanks–Williams prime
- Primorial prime
- Wagstaff prime
- Wall–Sun–Sun prime
- Wieferich prime
- Wilson prime
- Wolstenholme prime
- Woodall prime
- Prime pages

== Combinatorial number theory ==
- Covering system
- Small set (combinatorics)
- Erdős–Ginzburg–Ziv theorem
- Polynomial method
- Van der Waerden's theorem
- Szemerédi's theorem
- Collatz conjecture
- Gilbreath's conjecture
- Erdős–Graham conjecture
- Znám's problem

== Computational number theory ==
Note: Computational number theory is also known as algorithmic number theory.

- Residue number system
- Cunningham project
- Quadratic residuosity problem

=== Primality tests ===
- Prime factorization algorithm
- Trial division
- Sieve of Eratosthenes
- Probabilistic algorithm
- Fermat primality test
  - Pseudoprime
  - Carmichael number
  - Euler pseudoprime
  - Euler–Jacobi pseudoprime
  - Fibonacci pseudoprime
  - Probable prime
- Baillie–PSW primality test
- Miller–Rabin primality test
- Lucas–Lehmer primality test
- Lucas–Lehmer test for Mersenne numbers
- AKS primality test

=== Integer factorization ===
- Pollard's p − 1 algorithm
- Pollard's rho algorithm
- Lenstra elliptic curve factorization
- Quadratic sieve
- Special number field sieve
- General number field sieve
- Shor's algorithm
- RSA Factoring Challenge

=== Pseudo-random numbers ===
- Pseudorandom number generator
  - Pseudorandomness
  - Cryptographically secure pseudo-random number generator
- Middle-square method
- Blum Blum Shub
- ACORN
- ISAAC
- Lagged Fibonacci generator
- Linear congruential generator
- Mersenne twister
- Linear-feedback shift register
- Shrinking generator
- Stream cipher

see also List of random number generators.

== Arithmetic dynamics ==
- Aliquot sequence and Aliquot sum dynamics
  - Abundant number
  - Almost perfect number
  - Amicable number
  - Betrothed numbers
  - Deficient number
  - Quasiperfect number
  - Perfect number
  - Sociable number
- Collatz conjecture
- Digit sum dynamics
  - Additive persistence
  - Digital root
- Digit product dynamics
  - Multiplicative digital root
  - Multiplicative persistence
- Lychrel number
- Perfect digital invariant
  - Happy number

== History ==
- Disquisitiones Arithmeticae
- "On the Number of Primes Less Than a Given Magnitude"
- Vorlesungen über Zahlentheorie
- Prime Obsession
