= Mertens' theorem =

- For Mertens' results on the distribution of prime numbers, see Mertens' theorems.
- For Mertens' result on convergence of Cauchy products of series, see Cauchy product.
