= List of largest known primes and probable primes =

The table below lists the largest currently known prime numbers and probable primes (PRPs) as tracked by the PrimePages and by Henri & Renaud Lifchitz's PRP Records. Numbers with more than 2,000,000 digits are shown.

== Largest known primes ==
These numbers have been proved prime by computer with a primality test for their form, for example the Lucas–Lehmer primality test for Mersenne numbers. “!” is the factorial, “#” is the primorial, and $\Phi_3(x)$ is the third cyclotomic polynomial, defined as $x^2 + x + 1$.

Rank	Number	Discovery date	Decimal digits
1	2^{136279841} − 1	12 October 2024	41,024,320
2	2^{82589933} − 1	7 December 2018	24,862,048
3	2^{77232917} − 1	26 December 2017	23,249,425
4	2^{74207281} − 1	7 January 2016	22,338,618
5	2^{57885161} − 1	25 January 2013	17,425,170
6	2524190^{2097152} + 1	12 October 2025	13,426,224
7	2^{43112609} − 1	23 August 2008	12,978,189
8	2^{42643801} − 1	4 June 2009	12,837,064
9	$\Phi_3(-516693^{1048576})$	2 October 2023	11,981,518
10	$\Phi_3(-465859^{1048576})$	31 May 2023	11,887,192
11	2^{37156667} − 1	6 September 2008	11,185,272
12	2^{32582657} − 1	4 September 2006	9,808,358
13	10223×2^{31172165} + 1	31 October 2016	9,383,761
14	2^{30402457} − 1	15 December 2005	9,152,052
15	4×5^{11786358} + 1	1 October 2024	8,238,312
16	2^{25964951} − 1	18 February 2005	7,816,230
17	4052186×69^{4052186} + 1	16 April 2025	7,451,366
18	69×2^{24612729} − 1	13 August 2024	7,409,172
19	2^{24036583} − 1	15 May 2004	7,235,733
20	7172162^{1048576} + 1	12 August 2026	7,188,671
21	5336284^{1048576} + 1	31 October 2025	7,054,022
22	107347×2^{23427517} − 1	4 August 2024	7,052,391
23	3×2^{23157875} − 1	25 June 2025	6,971,216
24	3843236^{1048576} + 1	17 December 2024	6,904,556
25	3×2^{22103376} − 1	30 September 2024	6,653,780
26	1963736^{1048576} + 1	24 September 2022	6,598,776
27	1951734^{1048576} + 1	9 August 2022	6,595,985
28	202705×2^{21320516} + 1	25 November 2021	6,418,121
29	2^{20996011} − 1	17 November 2003	6,320,430
30	1059094^{1048576} + 1	31 October 2018	6,317,602
31	3×2^{20928756} − 1	5 July 2023	6,300,184
32	919444^{1048576} + 1	29 August 2017	6,253,210
33	81×2^{20498148} + 1	13 June 2023	6,170,560
34	7×2^{20267500} + 1	21 July 2022	6,101,127
35	4×5^{8431178} + 1	2 January 2024	5,893,142
36	168451×2^{19375200} + 1	17 September 2017	5,832,522
37	69×2^{19374980} − 1	3 July 2022	5,832,452
38	3×2^{18924888} − 1	24 March 2022	5,696,990
39	69×2^{18831865} − 1	16 December 2021	5,668,959
40	2×3^{11879700} + 1	22 June 2024	5,668,058
41	97139×2^{18397548} − 1	23 April 2023	5,538,219
42	7×2^{18233956} + 1	1 October 2020	5,488,969
43	3×2^{18196595} − 1	8 January 2022	5,477,722
44	4×3^{11279466} + 1	10 September 2024	5,381,674
45	3×2^{17748034} − 1	6 September 2021	5,342,692
46	$\Phi_3(-123447^{524288})$	23 February 2017	5,338,805
47	31×2^{17681433} − 1	14 May 2026	5,322,644
48	15×2^{17609618} + 1	12 May 2026	5,301,025
49	3622×5^{7558139} − 1	18 February 2022	5,282,917
50	127174×5^{7556055} − 1	15 October 2026	5,281,461
51	7×6^{6772401} + 1	9 September 2019	5,269,954
52	2×3^{10852677} + 1	8 January 2023	5,178,044
53	8508301×2^{17016603} − 1	21 March 2018	5,122,515
54	8×10^{5112848} − 1	30 January 2024	5,112,848
55	13×2^{16828072} + 1	11 October 2023	5,065,756
56	3×2^{16819291} − 1	20 January 2021	5,063,112
57	5287180×3^{10574360} − 1	3 November 2024	5,045,259
58	3×2^{16408818} + 1	25 October 2020	4,939,547
59	2329989×2^{16309923} − 1	13 February 2024	4,909,783
60	69×2^{15866556} + 1	20 August 2021	4,776,312
61	2036×3^{10009192} + 1	15 February 2024	4,775,602
62	2525332×73^{2525332} + 1	28 August 2021	4,705,888
63	1419499×2^{15614489} + 1	9 February 2024	4,700,436
64	11×2^{15502315} + 1	8 January 2023	4,666,663
65	(10^{2332974} + 1)^{2} − 2	20 February 2024	4,665,949
66	37×2^{15474010} + 1	8 November 2022	4,658,143
67	93839×2^{15337656} − 1	28 November 2022	4,617,100
68	2^{15317227}+2^{7658614} + 1	31 July 2020	4,610,945
69	13×2^{15294536} + 1	30 September 2023	4,604,116
70	6×5^{6546983} + 1	13 June 2020	4,576,146
71	4788920×3^{9577840} − 1	14 February 2024	4,569,798
72	31×2^{15145093} − 1	9 February 2025	4,559,129
73	69×2^{14977631} − 1	3 December 2021	4,508,719
74	192971×2^{14773498} − 1	7 March 2021	4,447,272
75	4×3^{9214845} + 1	10 September 2024	4,396,600
76	9145334×3^{9145334} + 1	25 December 2023	4,363,441
77	4×5^{6181673} − 1	15 July 2022	4,320,805
78	396101×2^{14259638} − 1	3 February 2024	4,292,585
79	6962×31^{2863120} − 1	29 February 2020	4,269,952
80	37×2^{14166940} + 1	24 June 2022	4,264,676
81	99739×2^{14019102} + 1	24 December 2019	4,220,176
82	69×2^{13832885} − 1	17 January 2022	4,164,116
83	9562633# + 1	25 June 2025	4,151,498
84	404849×2^{13764867} + 1	10 March 2021	4,143,644
85	25×2^{13719266} + 1	20 September 2022	4,129,912
86	81×2^{13708272} + 1	11 October 2022	4,126,603
87	2740879×2^{13704395} − 1	26 October 2019	4,125,441
88	479216×3^{8625889} − 1	16 November 2019	4,115,601
89	13×2^{13584543} − 1	30 May 2025	4,089,357
90	31×2^{13514933} − 1	9 February 2025	4,068,402
91	$\Phi_3(-143332^{393216})$	30 January 2017	4,055,114
92	81×2^{13470584} + 1	9 October 2022	4,055,052
93	2^{13466917} − 1	14 November 2001	4,053,946
94	5778486×5^{5778486} + 1	15 August 2024	4,038,996
95	9×2^{13334487} + 1	31 March 2020	4,014,082
96	6×10^{4000494} − 1	27 July 2026	4,000,495
97	206039×2^{13104952} − 1	26 April 2021	3,944,989
98	2805222×5^{5610444} + 1	2 September 2019	3,921,539
99	5128×22^{2919993} + 1	5 December 2024	3,919,869
100	29874078^{524288} + 1	17 November 2026	3,919,208
101	19249×2^{13018586} + 1	26 March 2007	3,918,990
102	29002212^{524288} + 1	12 October 2026	3,912,464
103	28019492^{524288} + 1	4 October 2026	3,904,615
104	27985952^{524288} + 1	5 October 2026	3,904,342
105	27171622^{524288} + 1	15 October 2026	3,897,618
106	26693202^{524288} + 1	7 October 2026	3,893,573
107	26689978^{524288} + 1	9 October 2026	3,893,546
108	2293×2^{12918431} − 1	13 February 2021	3,888,839
109	25457072^{524288} + 1	29 July 2026	3,882,509
110	23865586^{524288} + 1	27 April 2026	3,868,078
111	23680116^{524288} + 1	17 April 2026	3,866,301
112	22970694^{524288} + 1	19 March 2026	3,859,376
113	81×2^{12804541} + 1	19 September 2022	3,854,553
114	22444816^{524288} + 1	3 March 2026	3,854,102
115	22306708^{524288} + 1	28 February 2026	3,852,697
116	21826264^{524288} + 1	25 February 2026	3,847,739
117	67612×5^{5501582} + 1	8 April 2025	3,845,446
118	20221496^{524288} + 1	22 January 2026	3,830,351
119	19981416^{524288} + 1	5 February 2026	3,827,631
120	19409636^{524288} + 1	14 January 2026	3,821,021
121	18703062^{524288} + 1	9 December 2025	3,812,577
122	18529322^{524288} + 1	30 November 2025	3,810,452
123	18099898^{524288} + 1	1 September 2025	3,805,113
124	17997078^{524288} + 1	20 November 2025	3,803,816
125	17544674^{524288} + 1	25 October 2025	3,798,019
126	17502532^{524288} + 1	23 October 2025	3,797,471
127	17445908^{524288} + 1	19 October 2025	3,796,734
128	17177670^{524288} + 1	5 October 2025	3,793,205
129	16211276^{524288} + 1	9 August 2025	3,780,021
130	15958750^{524288} + 1	15 July 2025	3,776,446
131	15852200^{524288} + 1	8 July 2025	3,774,921
132	751882!/751879# + 1	7 December 2025	3,765,621
133	4×5^{5380542} + 1	22 February 2023	3,760,839
134	13520762^{524288} + 1	25 February 2025	3,738,699
135	13427472^{524288} + 1	3 March 2025	3,737,122
136	9×2^{12406887} + 1	29 March 2020	3,734,847
137	12900356^{524288} + 1	22 January 2025	3,728,004
138	12693488^{524288} + 1	6 January 2025	3,724,323
139	11937916^{524288} + 1	5 October 2024	3,710,349
140	7×2^{12286041} − 1	10 June 2023	3,698,468
141	10913140^{524288} + 1	19 June 2024	3,689,913
142	69×2^{12231580} − 1	27 July 2021	3,682,075
143	27×2^{12184319} + 1	6 February 2021	3,667,847
144	9332124^{524288} + 1	22 June 2024	3,654,278
145	8630170^{524288} + 1	13 April 2024	3,636,472
146	863282×5^{5179692} − 1	17 October 2024	3,620,456
147	670490×12^{3352450} − 1	17 October 2024	3,617,907
148	4×3^{7578378} + 1	9 September 2024	3,615,806
149	11×2^{11993994} − 1	15 August 2024	3,610,554
150	3761×2^{11978874} − 1	6 July 2022	3,606,004
151	95×2^{11954552} − 1	28 May 2024	3,598,681
152	259072×5^{5136295} − 1	28 October 2024	3,590,122
153	3×2^{11895718} − 1	23 June 2015	3,580,969
154	37×2^{11855148} + 1	30 May 2022	3,568,757
155	6339004^{524288} + 1	8 June 2023	3,566,218
156	763795×6^{4582771} + 1	11 December 2023	3,566,095
157	5897794^{524288} + 1	18 December 2022	3,549,792
158	29×2^{11749456} − 1	16 May 2026	3,536,941
159	3×2^{11731850} − 1	13 March 2015	3,531,640
160	69×2^{11718455} − 1	4 December 2020	3,527,609
161	21×2^{11715899} − 1	4 February 2026	3,526,839
162	8629×2^{11708579} − 1	19 September 2024	3,524,638
163	41×2^{11676439} + 1	20 June 2022	3,514,960
164	4896418^{524288} + 1	15 May 2022	3,507,424
165	81×2^{11616017} + 1	30 August 2022	3,496,772
166	69×2^{11604348} − 1	4 December 2020	3,493,259
167	4450871×6^{4450871} + 1	17 September 2023	3,463,458
168	9×2^{11500843} + 1	13 March 2020	3,462,100
169	3×2^{11484018} − 1	22 November 2014	3,457,035
170	193997×2^{11452891} + 1	3 April 2018	3,447,670
171	29914×5^{4930904} + 1	27 September 2024	3,446,559
172	3638450^{524288} + 1	29 May 2020	3,439,810
173	9221×2^{11392194} − 1	7 February 2021	3,429,397
174	9×2^{11366286} + 1	26 March 2020	3,421,594
175	$\Phi_3(-3328218^{262144})$	29 December 2025	3,419,518
176	5×2^{11355764} − 1	2 October 2021	3,418,427
177	732050×6^{4392301} + 1	9 September 2023	3,417,881
178	$\Phi_3(-3268739^{262144})$	10 November 2025	3,415,412
179	3214654^{524288} + 1	24 December 2019	3,411,613
180	632760! − 1	20 October 2024	3,395,992
181	146561×2^{11280802} − 1	16 November 2020	3,395,865
182	51208×5^{4857576} + 1	6 June 2024	3,395,305
183	2985036^{524288} + 1	18 September 2019	3,394,739
184	4591×2^{11270837} − 1	2 January 2025	3,392,864
185	6929×2^{11255424} − 1	7 July 2022	3,388,225
186	2877652^{524288} + 1	29 June 2019	3,386,397
187	2788032^{524288} + 1	17 April 2019	3,379,193
188	2733014^{524288} + 1	18 March 2019	3,374,655
189	$\Phi_3(-2637072^{262144})$	4 December 2025	3,366,518
190	9×2^{11158963} + 1	13 March 2020	3,359,184
191	9271×2^{11134335} − 1	17 January 2021	3,351,773
192	136804×5^{4777253} − 1	1 March 2024	3,339,162
193	2312092^{524288} + 1	4 August 2018	3,336,572
194	987324×48^{1974648} − 1	12 October 2024	3,319,866
195	2061748^{524288} + 1	20 March 2018	3,310,478
196	1880370^{524288} + 1	15 January 2018	3,289,511
197	27×2^{10902757} − 1	7 March 2022	3,282,059
198	3×2^{10829346} + 1	14 January 2014	3,259,959
199	11×2^{10803449} + 1	29 May 2022	3,252,164
200	11×2^{10797109} + 1	29 May 2022	3,250,255
201	7×2^{10612737} − 1	19 May 2022	3,194,154
202	7351117# + 1	14 September 2024	3,191,401
203	37×2^{10599476} + 1	17 June 2022	3,190,762
204	5×2^{10495620} − 1	26 September 2021	3,159,498
205	$\tfrac{\Phi_3(-3^{3304302}+1)}{3}$	30 June 2023	3,153,105
206	5×2^{10349000} − 1	26 September 2021	3,115,361
207	$\Phi_3(-844833^{262144})$	17 January 2017	3,107,335
208	17×2^{10248660} − 1	8 August 2025	3,085,156
209	52922×5^{4399812} − 1	3 August 2023	3,075,342
210	$\Phi_3(-712012^{262144})$	14 January 2017	3,068,389
211	177742×5^{4386703} − 1	24 July 2023	3,066,180
212	4×3^{6402015} + 1	9 September 2024	3,054,539
213	874208×54^{1748416} − 1	26 September 2019	3,028,951
214	475856^{524288} + 1	8 August 2012	2,976,633
215	2×3^{6236772} + 1	20 December 2022	2,975,697
216	15×3^{9830108} + 1	19 August 2023	2,959,159
217	9×2^{9778263} + 1	5 August 2020	2,943,552
218	198×558^{1061348} + 1	30 August 2024	2,915,138
219	1806676×41^{1806676} + 1	11 March 2018	2,913,785
220	356926^{524288} + 1	20 June 2012	2,911,151
221	341112^{524288} + 1	15 June 2012	2,900,832
222	213988×5^{4138363} − 1	29 November 2022	2,892,597
223	43×2^{9596983} − 1	28 February 2022	2,888,982
224	121×2^{9584444} + 1	18 November 2020	2,885,208
225	15×2^{9482269} − 1	14 August 2024	2,854,449
226	6533299# − 1	18 August 2024	2,835,864
227	11×2^{9381365} + 1	7 March 2020	2,824,074
228	15×2^{9312889} + 1	7 August 2023	2,803,461
229	97×2^{9305542} + 1	10 May 2025	2,801,250
230	704501×2^{9279026} − 1	17 November 2026	2,793,272
231	93×2^{9235048} + 1	7 May 2025	2,780,029
232	49×2^{9187790} + 1	11 September 2022	2,765,803
233	6369619# + 1	12 August 2024	2,765,105
234	27653×2^{9167433} + 1	8 June 2005	2,759,677
235	6354977# − 1	12 August 2024	2,758,832
236	90527×2^{9162167} + 1	30 June 2010	2,758,093
237	71×2^{9161150} − 1	30 August 2026	2,757,783
238	6795×2^{9144320} − 1	31 March 2021	2,752,719
239	31×2^{9088085} − 1	27 August 2024	2,735,788
240	75×2^{9079482} + 1	25 July 2023	2,733,199
241	1323365×116^{1323365} + 1	18 January 2018	2,732,038
242	57×2^{9075622} − 1	7 August 2022	2,732,037
243	10^{2718281} − 5×10^{1631138} − 5×10^{1087142} − 1	6 August 2024	2,718,281
244	63838×5^{3887851} − 1	19 June 2022	2,717,497
245	13×2^{8989858} + 1	10 March 2020	2,706,219
246	271357×2^{8943013} − 1	13 October 2025	2,692,121
247	4159×2^{8938471} − 1	19 April 2022	2,690,752
248	273809×2^{8932416} − 1	13 December 2017	2,688,931
249	93×2^{8898285} + 1	4 March 2024	2,678,653
250	2×3^{5570081} + 1	14 February 2020	2,657,605
251	25×2^{8788628} + 1	1 March 2021	2,645,643
252	2038×366^{1028507} − 1	4 April 2016	2,636,562
253	64598×5^{3769854} − 1	14 June 2022	2,635,020
254	63×2^{8741225} + 1	6 May 2024	2,631,373
255	8×785^{900325} + 1	4 June 2022	2,606,325
256	17×2^{8636199} + 1	17 February 2021	2,599,757
257	75898^{524288} + 1	19 November 2011	2,558,647
258	25×2^{8456828} + 1	27 January 2021	2,545,761
259	39×2^{8413422} + 1	23 January 2021	2,532,694
260	31×2^{8348000} + 1	19 January 2021	2,513,000
261	27×2^{8342438} − 1	1 February 2021	2,511,326
262	17×2^{8330892} − 1	16 July 2025	2,507,850
263	3867×2^{8261084} − 1	14 April 2021	2,486,838
264	101×2^{8152967} + 1	2 December 2023	2,454,290
265	9×2^{8128075} − 1	8 July 2025	2,446,796
266	273662×5^{3493296} − 1	7 December 2021	2,441,715
267	81×2^{8109236} + 1	9 September 2022	2,441,126
268	11×2^{8103463} + 1	6 March 2020	2,439,387
269	102818×5^{3440382} − 1	8 October 2021	2,404,729
270	9×2^{7979119} − 1	8 July 2025	2,401,956
271	11×2^{7971110} − 1	25 November 2019	2,399,545
272	27×2^{7963247} + 1	14 January 2021	2,397,178
273	3177×2^{7954621} − 1	13 June 2021	2,394,584
274	39×2^{7946769} + 1	14 January 2021	2,392,218
275	7×6^{3072198} + 1	4 August 2019	2,390,636
276	3765×2^{7904593} − 1	10 January 2021	2,379,524
277	29×2^{7899985} + 1	14 January 2021	2,378,134
278	5113×2^{7895471} − 1	27 November 2022	2,376,778
279	861×2^{7895451} − 1	21 February 2021	2,376,771
280	75×2^{7886683} + 1	4 September 2023	2,374,131
281	3243959×2^{7862047} + 1	3 December 2025	2,366,719
282	2661×2^{7861390} − 1	28 December 2024	2,366,518
283	21×2^{7838882} − 1	15 August 2025	2,359,740
284	30397×2^{7838120} + 1	17 August 2025	2,359,514
285	99×2^{7830910} + 1	24 April 2024	2,357,341
286	28433×2^{7830457} + 1	31 December 2004	2,357,207
287	2589×2^{7803339} − 1	21 August 2022	2,349,043
288	59×2^{7792307} + 1	24 April 2024	2,345,720
289	101×2^{7784453} + 1	24 April 2024	2,343,356
290	95×2^{7778585} + 1	24 April 2024	2,341,590
291	8401×2^{7767655} − 1	24 April 2023	2,338,302
292	9693×2^{7767343} − 1	17 November 2023	2,338,208
293	1581658×30^{1581658} + 1	17 April 2026	2,336,307
294	5×2^{7755002} − 1	23 September 2021	2,334,489
295	2945×2^{7753232} − 1	27 November 2022	2,333,959
296	2×836^{798431} + 1	10 September 2024	2,333,181
297	63×2^{7743186} + 1	24 April 2024	2,330,934
298	2545×2^{7732265} − 1	13 January 2021	2,327,648
299	5539×2^{7730709} − 1	15 January 2021	2,327,180
300	4817×2^{7719584} − 1	13 June 2021	2,323,831
301	2151×2^{7719549} − 1	24 May 2026	2,323,820
302	183×558^{842752} + 1	23 August 2024	2,314,734
303	1341174×53^{1341174} + 1	21 August 2017	2,312,561
304	9467×2^{7680034} − 1	20 February 2022	2,311,925
305	45×2^{7661004} + 1	13 December 2020	2,306,194
306	15×2^{7619838} + 1	6 December 2020	2,293,801
307	3645×2^{7610003} − 1	28 August 2025	2,290,843
308	3597×2^{7580693} − 1	10 January 2021	2,282,020
309	5256037# + 1	6 August 2024	2,281,955
310	38118498221×2^{7552807} + 1	7 October 2025	2,273,633
311	3129×2^{7545557} − 1	14 March 2023	2,271,443
312	7401×2^{7523295} − 1	21 February 2021	2,264,742
313	45×2^{7513661} + 1	12 November 2020	2,261,839
314	$\Phi_3(-558640^{196608})$	11 January 2017	2,259,865
315	2739×2^{7483537} − 1	1 May 2025	2,252,773
316	9×2^{7479919} − 1	3 June 2023	2,251,681
317	1875×2^{7474308} − 1	21 August 2022	2,249,995
318	69×2^{7452023} + 1	23 March 2023	2,243,285
319	1281879×2^{7447178} + 1	27 December 2023	2,241,831
320	9107×2^{7417464} − 1	3 May 2025	2,232,884
321	4×5^{3189669} − 1	12 July 2022	2,229,484
322	19×2^{7383785} − 1	11 July 2025	2,222,743
323	29×2^{7374577} + 1	27 October 2020	2,219,971
324	2653×2^{7368343} − 1	18 September 2024	2,218,096
325	21555×2^{7364128} − 1	4 September 2024	2,216,828
326	3197×2^{7359542} − 1	27 November 2022	2,215,447
327	109838×5^{3168862} − 1	13 August 2020	2,214,945
328	95×2^{7354869} + 1	25 September 2023	2,214,039
329	101×2^{7345194} − 1	5 October 2019	2,211,126
330	85×2^{7333444} + 1	25 September 2023	2,207,589
331	15×2^{7300254} + 1	25 October 2020	2,197,597
332	6733×2^{7285527} − 1	26 October 2025	2,193,166
333	422429! + 1	21 February 2022	2,193,027
334	1759×2^{7284439} − 1	28 August 2021	2,192,838
335	1909683×14^{1909683} + 1	27 May 2023	2,188,748
336	737×2^{7269322} − 1	10 August 2017	2,188,287
337	6909×2^{7258896} − 1	18 September 2024	2,185,150
338	93×2^{7241494} + 1	25 September 2023	2,179,909
339	118568×5^{3112069} + 1	1 May 2020	2,175,248
340	4215×2^{7221386} − 1	27 December 2024	2,173,858
341	40×257^{901632} + 1	11 September 2024	2,172,875
342	1685×2^{7213108} − 1	13 April 2025	2,171,366
343	580633×2^{7208783} − 1	15 February 2024	2,170,066
344	6039×2^{7207973} − 1	24 March 2021	2,169,820
345	1871×2^{7207954} − 1	26 September 2025	2,169,814
346	502573×2^{7181987} − 1	4 October 2014	2,162,000
347	1503×2^{7175467} − 1	2 May 2026	2,160,034
348	402539×2^{7173024} − 1	2 October 2014	2,159,301
349	3343×2^{7166019} − 1	29 September 2016	2,157,191
350	4137×2^{7132569} − 1	11 April 2025	2,147,121
351	161041×2^{7107964} + 1	6 January 2015	2,139,716
352	294×213^{918952} − 1	19 September 2023	2,139,672
353	17×2^{7101254} − 1	11 July 2025	2,137,692
354	27×2^{7046834} + 1	11 October 2018	2,121,310
355	1759×2^{7046791} − 1	28 August 2021	2,121,299
356	327×2^{7044001} − 1	13 January 2021	2,120,459
357	5×2^{7037188} − 1	22 September 2021	2,118,406
358	3×2^{7033641} + 1	21 February 2011	2,117,338
359	625783×2^{7031319} − 1	10 February 2024	2,116,644
360	33661×2^{7031232} + 1	30 October 2007	2,116,617
361	$\Phi_3(-237804^{196608})$	6 January 2017	2,114,016
362	207494×5^{3017502} − 1	16 March 2020	2,109,149
363	15×2^{6993631} − 1	25 August 2021	2,105,294
364	8943501×2^{6972593} − 1	8 January 2022	2,098,967
365	6020095×2^{6972593} − 1	4 September 2022	2,098,967
366	2^{6972593} − 1	1 June 1999	2,098,960
367	100206278^{262144} + 1	26 January 2026	2,097,387
368	100013182^{262144} + 1	26 January 2026	2,097,168
369	273×2^{6963847} − 1	16 November 2022	2,096,330
370	99269260^{262144} + 1	15 November 2026	2,096,318
371	98348488^{262144} + 1	16 October 2026	2,095,257
372	6219×2^{6958945} − 1	7 January 2021	2,094,855
373	97861580^{262144} + 1	29 September 2026	2,094,692
374	97314420^{262144} + 1	12 September 2026	2,094,053
375	96721520^{262144} + 1	24 August 2026	2,093,357
376	96633068^{262144} + 1	18 August 2026	2,093,253
377	95511706^{262144} + 1	6 August 2026	2,091,924
378	51×2^{6945567} + 1	26 May 2020	2,090,826
379	94446258^{262144} + 1	21 July 2026	2,090,647
380	93676308^{262144} + 1	3 July 2026	2,089,715
381	93590610^{262144} + 1	1 July 2026	2,089,611
382	92943822^{262144} + 1	17 June 2026	2,088,822
383	92605848^{262144} + 1	12 June 2026	2,088,407
384	91898096^{262144} + 1	5 June 2026	2,087,534
385	91056676^{262144} + 1	26 May 2026	2,086,486
386	90874290^{262144} + 1	24 May 2026	2,085,875
387	90569054^{262144} + 1	18 May 2026	2,085,875
388	89868368^{262144} + 1	9 May 2026	2,084,991
389	8×10^{2084563} − 1	1 June 2025	2,084,564
390	89239070^{262144} + 1	27 April 2026	2,084,191
391	3323×2^{6921196} − 1	18 September 2024	2,083,492
392	88088376^{262144} + 1	8 April 2026	2,082,713
393	238694×5^{2979422} − 1	12 March 2020	2,082,532
394	87887018^{262144} + 1	6 April 2026	2,082,453
395	87801308^{262144} + 1	4 April 2026	2,082,342
396	87124982^{262144} + 1	26 March 2026	2,081,461
397	86369496^{262144} + 1	18 March 2026	2,080,470
398	4×72^{1119849} − 1	7 September 2016	2,079,933
399	84561734^{262144} + 1	7 March 2026	2,078,062
400	129×2^{6900230} + 1	5 June 2025	2,077,179
401	83479504^{262144} + 1	2 March 2026	2,076,595
402	83211382^{262144} + 1	27 February 2026	2,076,229
403	33×2^{6894190} − 1	27 July 2021	2,075,360
404	82060924^{262144} + 1	20 February 2026	2,074,644
405	4778027# − 1	31 July 2024	2,073,926
406	105×2^{6884697} + 1	2 June 2025	2,072,503
407	80514060^{262144} + 1	10 February 2026	2,072,477
408	2345×2^{6882320} − 1	13 April 2022	2,071,789
409	79523718^{262144} + 1	5 February 2026	2,071,068
410	77784266^{262144} + 1	20 January 2026	2,068,550
411	77708974^{262144} + 1	19 January 2026	2,068,440
412	77662142^{262144} + 1	18 January 2026	2,068,372
413	77586084^{262144} + 1	17 January 2026	2,068,260
414	77412518^{262144} + 1	14 January 2026	2,068,005
415	76013952^{262144} + 1	25 December 2025	2,065,929
416	75810636^{262144} + 1	20 December 2025	2,065,624
417	75753274^{262144} + 1	20 December 2025	2,065,538
418	57×2^{6857990} + 1	17 August 2023	2,064,463
419	146264×5^{2953282} − 1	9 March 2020	2,064,261
420	74732694^{262144} + 1	10 December 2025	2,063,994
421	74716572^{262144} + 1	10 December 2025	2,063,970
422	74399970^{262144} + 1	5 December 2025	2,063,486
423	74336726^{262144} + 1	4 December 2025	2,063,389
424	73597220^{262144} + 1	25 November 2025	2,062,251
425	73589294^{262144} + 1	24 November 2025	2,062,239
426	73465436^{262144} + 1	21 November 2025	2,062,047
427	73116844^{262144} + 1	13 November 2025	2,061,505
428	72862906^{262144} + 1	9 November 2025	2,061,109
429	72752758^{262144} + 1	4 November 2025	2,060,937
430	72718062^{262144} + 1	4 November 2025	2,060,883
431	72071732^{262144} + 1	22 October 2025	2,059,866
432	71737620^{262144} + 1	18 October 2025	2,059,337
433	71380700^{262144} + 1	13 October 2025	2,058,770
434	69×2^{6838971} − 1	1 March 2020	2,058,738
435	35816×5^{2945294} − 1	5 March 2020	2,058,677
436	71107798^{262144} + 1	11 October 2025	2,058,333
437	127×2^{6836153} − 1	25 June 2018	2,057,890
438	105×2^{6835099} + 1	26 May 2025	2,057,572
439	70520422^{262144} + 1	29 September 2025	2,057,389
440	70349734^{262144} + 1	27 September 2025	2,057,113
441	19×2^{6833086} + 1	24 October 2020	2,056,966
442	69844790^{262144} + 1	22 September 2025	2,056,293
443	69810332^{262144} + 1	22 September 2025	2,056,237
444	69290228^{262144} + 1	20 September 2025	2,055,386
445	69170386^{262144} + 1	13 September 2025	2,055,189
446	68717884^{262144} + 1	30 August 2025	2,054,441
447	68000464^{262144} + 1	10 August 2025	2,053,246
448	67886950^{262144} + 1	9 August 2025	2,053,056
449	67673558^{262144} + 1	5 August 2025	2,052,698
450	67535128^{262144} + 1	2 August 2025	2,052,465
451	67433562^{262144} + 1	2 August 2025	2,052,293
452	67167678^{262144} + 1	24 July 2025	2,051,844
453	67141518^{262144} + 1	24 July 2025	2,051,799
454	67062340^{262144} + 1	22 July 2025	2,051,665
455	66498472^{262144} + 1	8 July 2025	2,050,704
456	66342922^{262144} + 1	4 July 2025	2,050,437
457	66266188^{262144} + 1	3 July 2025	2,050,305
458	65×2^{6810465} + 1	22 September 2023	2,050,157
459	40597×2^{6808509} − 1	25 December 2013	2,049,571
460	283×2^{6804701} − 1	19 January 2020	2,048,431
461	65136498^{262144} + 1	20 June 2025	2,048,348
462	64989720^{262144} + 1	18 June 2025	2,048,091
463	64074894^{262144} + 1	30 May 2025	2,046,447
464	64010198^{262144} + 1	30 May 2025	2,046,362
465	63833640^{262144} + 1	27 May 2025	2,046,047
466	8×10^{2045966} − 1	31 May 2025	2,045,967
467	63784742^{262144} + 1	26 May 2025	2,045,960
468	63558122^{262144} + 1	27 May 2025	2,045,555
469	63448958^{262144} + 1	22 May 2025	2,045,359
470	63286690^{262144} + 1	19 May 2025	2,045,068
471	62767176^{262144} + 1	9 May 2025	2,044,129
472	62747994^{262144} + 1	9 May 2025	2,044,095
473	1861209×2^{6789999} + 1	2 December 2020	2,044,000
474	5817×2^{6789459} − 1	9 January 2021	2,043,835
475	62311952^{262144} + 1	3 May 2025	2,043,301
476	62199610^{262144} + 1	5 May 2025	2,043,095
477	62152830^{262144} + 1	1 May 2025	2,043,010
478	62136706^{262144} + 1	2 May 2025	2,042,980
479	8435×2^{6786180} − 1	7 January 2021	2,042,848
480	61238184^{262144} + 1	21 April 2025	2,041,322
481	119×2^{6777781} + 1	18 May 2025	2,040,318
482	59145944^{262144} + 1	29 March 2025	2,037,364
483	58936230^{262144} + 1	28 March 2025	2,036,960
484	58870004^{262144} + 1	28 March 2025	2,036,832
485	58846688^{262144} + 1	28 March 2025	2,036,787
486	58333324^{262144} + 1	28 March 2025	2,035,789
487	58288282^{262144} + 1	28 March 2025	2,035,701
488	57643582^{262144} + 1	28 March 2025	2,034,435
489	57594478^{262144} + 1	28 March 2025	2,034,338
490	57478518^{262144} + 1	28 March 2025	2,034,108
491	57429230^{262144} + 1	27 March 2025	2,034,111
492	51×2^{6753404} + 1	26 May 2020	2,032,979
493	93×2^{6750726} + 1	18 September 2023	2,032,173
494	56303352^{262144} + 1	27 March 2025	2,031,757
495	56295176^{262144} + 1	26 March 2025	2,031,740
496	55952434^{262144} + 1	26 March 2025	2,031,045
497	55892864^{262144} + 1	27 March 2025	2,030,920
498	69×2^{6745775} + 1	21 March 2023	2,030,683
499	55702322^{262144} + 1	27 March 2025	2,030,535
500	55695224^{262144} + 1	25 March 2025	2,030,520
501	55169618^{262144} + 1	25 March 2025	2,029,441
502	55007338^{262144} + 1	25 March 2025	2,029,105
503	54852328^{262144} + 1	25 March 2025	2,028,784
504	54528918^{262144} + 1	26 March 2025	2,028,111
505	54044092^{262144} + 1	24 March 2025	2,027,094
506	53903472^{262144} + 1	24 March 2025	2,026,797
507	53750036^{262144} + 1	24 March 2025	2,026,473
508	53616962^{262144} + 1	28 March 2025	2,026,191
509	53311612^{262144} + 1	24 March 2025	2,025,540
510	4681×2^{6728157} − 1	25 August 2025	2,025,381
511	53008094^{262144} + 1	23 March 2025	2,024,890
512	52648144^{262144} + 1	21 March 2025	2,024,115
513	52599274^{262144} + 1	20 March 2025	2,024,009
514	52592976^{262144} + 1	21 March 2025	2,023,995
515	117×2^{6719464} + 1	10 May 2025	2,022,763
516	51992174^{262144} + 1	16 March 2025	2,022,687
517	51852794^{262144} + 1	14 March 2025	2,022,382
518	51714136^{262144} + 1	13 March 2025	2,022,077
519	51283286^{262144} + 1	9 March 2025	2,021,124
520	51125138^{262144} + 1	7 March 2025	2,020,773
521	9995×2^{6711008} − 1	31 December 2020	2,020,219
522	50454356^{262144} + 1	1 March 2025	2,019,269
523	50449664^{262144} + 1	28 February 2025	2,019,259
524	50366208^{262144} + 1	28 February 2025	2,019,070
525	50121532^{262144} + 1	27 February 2025	2,018,516
526	49536902^{262144} + 1	25 February 2025	2,017,180
527	49235348^{262144} + 1	23 February 2025	2,016,485
528	49209090^{262144} + 1	23 February 2025	2,016,424
529	48055302^{262144} + 1	18 February 2025	2,013,723
530	47707672^{262144} + 1	16 February 2025	2,012,896
531	39×2^{6684941} + 1	20 October 2020	2,012,370
532	47351862^{262144} + 1	15 February 2025	2,012,044
533	47281922^{262144} + 1	13 February 2025	2,011,876
534	47255958^{262144} + 1	13 February 2025	2,011,813
535	6679881×2^{6679881} + 1	25 July 2009	2,010,852
536	46831458^{262144} + 1	11 February 2025	2,010,786
537	46378776^{262144} + 1	8 February 2025	2,009,680
538	45073202^{262144} + 1	21 January 2025	2,006,469
539	45007104^{262144} + 1	19 January 2025	2,006,202
540	44819108^{262144} + 1	14 January 2025	2,005,786
541	44666524^{262144} + 1	12 January 2025	2,005,397
542	6×579^{725792} + 1	20 October 2026	2,005,131
543	37×2^{6660841} − 1	30 July 2014	2,005,115
544	44144624^{262144} + 1	29 December 2024	2,004,059
545	44030166^{262144} + 1	30 December 2024	2,003,764
546	43330794^{262144} + 1	3 December 2024	2,001,941
547	39×2^{6648997} + 1	20 October 2020	2,001,550
548	42781592^{262144} + 1	18 November 2024	2,000,489
549	10^{2000007} − 10^{1127194} − 10^{872812} − 1	12 January 2024	2,000,007
550	10^{2000005} − 10^{1051046} − 10^{948958} − 1	6 January 2024	2,000,005

== Largest known probable primes (PRPs) ==
These are probable primes. Primality has not been proven because it is too hard for general numbers of this size but they are expected to be primes. F(n) is the nth Fibonacci number.

Rank	Number	Discovery date	Decimal digits
1	$\tfrac{10^{8177207}-1}{9}$	8 May 2021	8,177,207
2	$\tfrac{10^{5794777}-1}{9}$	19 April 2021	5,794,777
3	$\tfrac{2^{15135397}+1}{3}$	June 2021	4,556,209
4	$\tfrac{21^{3078871}-1}{20}$	June 2026	4,070,942
5	$\tfrac{3^{8530117}-1}{2}$	November 2023	4,069,900
6	2^{13380298} − 27	March 2021	4,027,872
7	$\tfrac{2^{13372531}+1}{3}$	September 2013	4,025,533
8	$\tfrac{2^{13347311}+1}{3}$	September 2013	4,017,941
9	$\tfrac{2^{12720787}-1}{1666870069020922905132673131516413926009285199}$	3 July 2022	3,829,294
10	$\tfrac{3^{7973131}-1}{2}$	November 2023	3,804,150
11	$\tfrac{2^{12588091}-1}{32075464348897282169539424801}$	10 April 2023	3,789,365
12	$\tfrac{2^{12503723}-2^{6251862}+1}{5}$	July 2020	3,763,995
13	$\tfrac{5^{5154509}-1}{4}$	February 2024	3,602,847
14	$\tfrac{5^{4939471}-1}{4}$	January 2024	3,452,542
15	$\tfrac{3^{7034611}+1}{4}$	December 2024	3,356,362
16	$\tfrac{6^{4120873}+1}{7}$	April 2026	3,206,662
17	$\tfrac{2^{10443557}-1}{37289325994807}$	9 July 2020	3,143,811
18	$\tfrac{7^{3417779}+1}{8}$	November 2025	2,888,358
19	2^{9092392} + 40291	February 2011	2,737,083
20	$\tfrac{14^{2307467}+1}{15}$	June 2025	2,644,652
21	$\tfrac{6^{3360347}-1}{5}$	October 2023	2,614,858
22	$\tfrac{9^{2698541}+1}{10}$	February 2026	2,575,062
23	F(11964299)	28 June 2025	2,500,391
24	$\tfrac{2^{8247949}-1}{45487316822291087700751210632267642069671672071}$	3 June 2024	2,482,834
25	$\tfrac{17^{1990523}-1}{16}$	August 2020	2,449,236
26	$\tfrac{35963^{524288}+1}{2}$	August 2022	2,388,581
27	500186^{54465} + 54465^{500186}	August 2024	2,368,940
28	$\tfrac{11^{2264611}+1}{12}$	July 2021	2,358,349
29	$\tfrac{5^{3300593}-1}{4}$	February 2022	2,307,015
30	$\tfrac{3^{4694803}+2^{4694803}}{5}$	December 2023	2,239,990
31	$\tfrac{2^{7313983}-1}{305492080276193}$	1 March 2018	2,201,714
32	$\tfrac{3^{4571447}+2^{4571447}}{5}$	December 2023	2,181,134
33	$\tfrac{15^{1848811}+1}{16}$	July 2024	2,174,370
34	F(10367321)	10 August 2024	2,166,642
35	$\tfrac{15^{1841911}+1}{16}$	July 2024	2,166,255
36	3^{4532794} + 4532794^{3}	October 2023	2,162,693
37	F(10317107)	27 July 2024	2,156,148
38	$\tfrac{2^{7080247}-1}{17045259548603283727480473638587228614426296913631}$	27 October 2017	2,131,318
39	360834^{356345} + 356345^{360834}	February 2024	2,003,304
40	360339^{356572} + 356572^{360339}	May 2024	2,000,656

== See also ==
- Largest known prime number
