= Megaprime =

Prime number with at least one million digits

A megaprime is a prime number with at least one million decimal digits.

Other terms for large primes include "titanic prime", coined by Samuel Yates in the 1980s for a prime with at least 1000 digits (of which the smallest is 10^{999}+7), and "gigantic prime" for a prime with at least 10,000 digits (of which the smallest is 10^{9999}+33603).

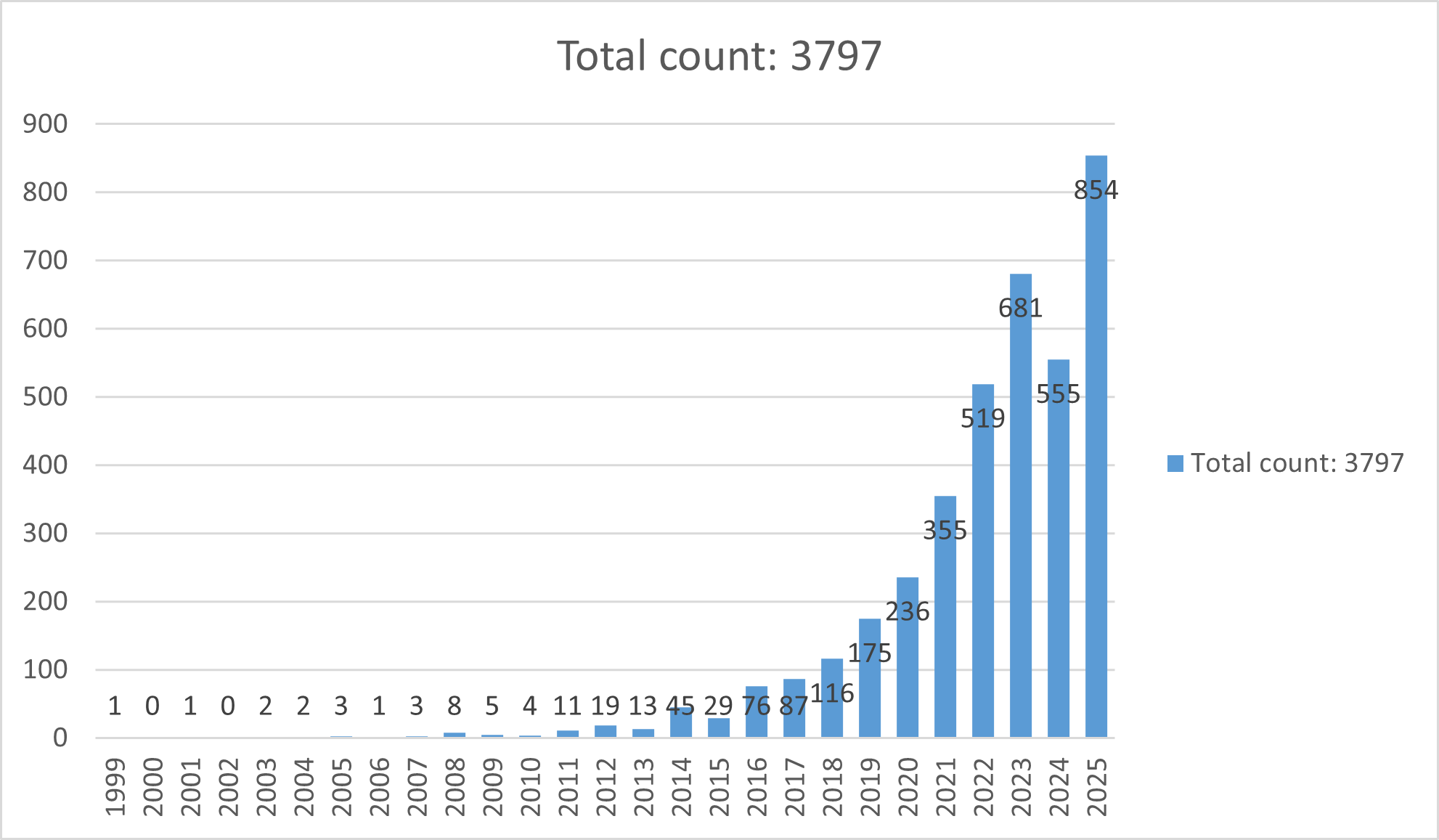
Number of megaprimes found by year through 2025

As of 1 January 2026, there are 3,797 known megaprimes which have more than 1,000,000 digits. The first to be found was the Mersenne prime 2^{6972593}−1 with 2,098,960 digits, discovered in 1999 by Nayan Hajratwala, a participant in the distributed computing project GIMPS. Nayan was awarded a Cooperative Computing Award from the Electronic Frontier Foundation for this achievement.

Almost all primes are megaprimes, as the number of primes with fewer than one million digits is finite. However, the vast majority of known primes are not megaprimes.

All numbers from 10^{999999} through 10^{999999} + 593498 are known to be composite, and there is a very high probability that 10^{999999} + 593499, a strong probable prime for each of 8 different bases, is the smallest megaprime. As of 2024, the smallest number known to be a megaprime is 10^{999999} + 308267×10^{292000} + 1.

The last prime that is not a megaprime is currently unknown. As of 2024, the largest prime number known to not be a megaprime is 10^{999999} − 1022306×10^{287000} − 1. There is a very high probability that 10^{999999} − 172473 is the biggest non-mega prime.

== See also ==
- List of largest known primes and probable primes, a list that includes the largest known megaprimes and probable megaprimes
- Largest known prime number
- Electronic Frontier Foundation § Awards
