= Franz Mertens =

Polish-Austrian mathematician

- Born: 20 March 1840; Schroda, Prussia
- Died: 5 March 1927 (aged 86); Vienna, Austria
- Education: University of Berlin
- Known for: Mertens conjecture Mertens function Meissel–Mertens constant Mertens's theorems
- Scientific career
- Fields: Mathematics
- Workplaces: University of Vienna; Graz Polytechnic; Jagiellonian University
- Doctoral advisor: Ernst Eduard Kummer; Leopold Kronecker
- Doctoral students: Ernst S. Fischer; Eduard Helly

Franz Mertens (20 March 1840 – 5 March 1927) (also known as Franciszek Mertens) was a German-Polish mathematician. He was born in Schroda in the Grand Duchy of Posen, Kingdom of Prussia (now Środa Wielkopolska, Poland) and died in Vienna, Austria.

The Mertens function M(x) is the sum function for the Möbius function, in the theory of arithmetic functions. The Mertens conjecture concerning its growth, conjecturing it bounded by x^{1/2}, which would have implied the Riemann hypothesis, is now known to be false (Odlyzko and te Riele, 1985). The Meissel–Mertens constant is analogous to the Euler–Mascheroni constant, but the harmonic series sum in its definition is only over the primes rather than over all integers and the logarithm is taken twice, not just once. Mertens's theorems are three 1874 results related to the density of prime numbers.

Erwin Schrödinger was taught calculus and algebra by Mertens.

His memory is honoured by the Franciszek Mertens Scholarship granted (from 2017) to those outstanding pupils of foreign secondary schools who wish to study at the Faculty of Mathematics and Computer Science of the Jagiellonian University in Kraków and were finalists of the national-level mathematics, or computer science olympiads, or they have participated in one of the following international olympiads: in mathematics (IMO), computer science (IOI), artificial intelligence (IOAI), astronomy (IAO), astronomy and astrophysics (IOAA), physics (IPhO), linguistics (IOL), European Girls' Mathematical Olympiad (EGMO), European Girls’ Olympiad in Informatics (EGOI), Romanian Masters of Mathematics (RMM), Romanian Masters of Informatics (RMI) or International Zhautykov Olympiad (IZhO).

== See also ==
- Mertens's theorems
- Cauchy product
