= Ernst Meissel =

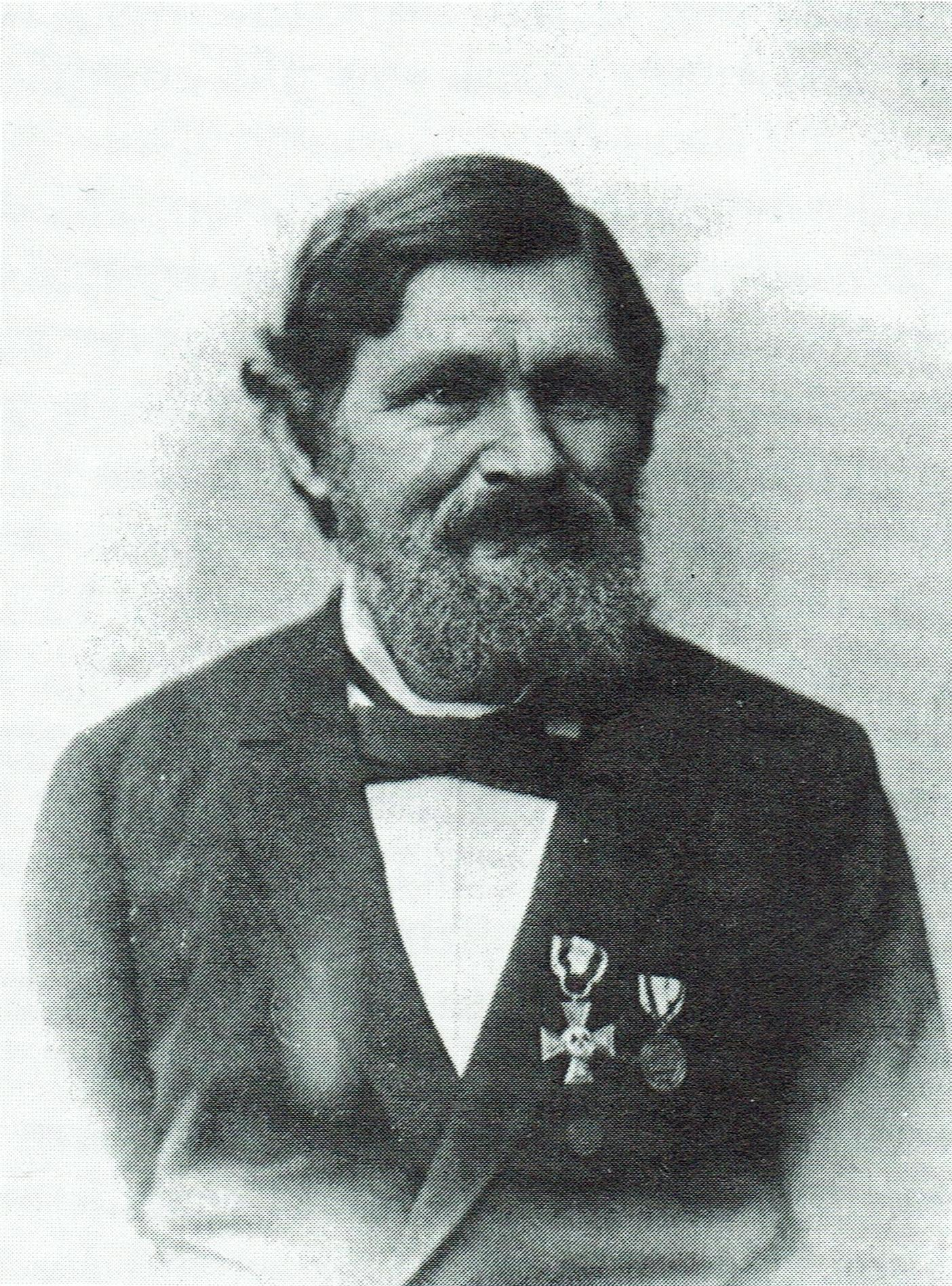

Daniel Friedrich Ernst Meissel (31 July 1826 in Eberswalde, Brandenburg Province – 11 March 1895 in Kiel) was a German teacher and school director who contributed to various aspects of number theory.

== See also ==
- Meissel–Lehmer algorithm
- Meissel–Mertens constant
