= Zhang Qiujian Suanjing =

Work of the fifth century Chinese mathematician, Zhang Qiujian

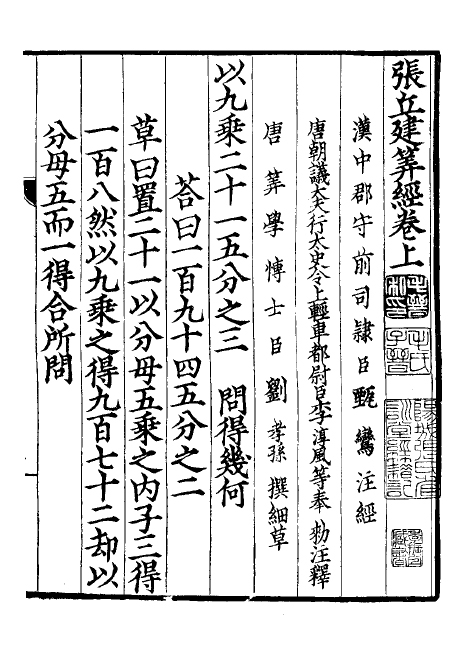
Zhang Qiujian Suanjing

Zhang Qiujian Suanjing (張邱建算經; The Mathematical Classic of Zhang Qiujian) is the only known work of the fifth century Chinese mathematician, Zhang Qiujian. It is one of ten mathematical books known collectively as Suanjing shishu (The Ten Computational Canons). In 656 CE, when mathematics was included in the imperial examinations, these ten outstanding works were selected as textbooks. Jiuzhang suanshu (The Nine Chapters on the Mathematical Art) and Sunzi Suanjing (The Mathematical Classic of Sunzi) are two of these texts that precede Zhang Qiujian suanjing. All three works share a large number of common topics. In Zhang Qiujian suanjing one can find the continuation of the development of mathematics from the earlier two classics. Internal evidences suggest that book was compiled sometime between 466 and 485 CE.

"Zhang Qiujian suanjing has an important place in the world history of mathematics: it is one of those rare books before AD 500 that manifests the upward development of mathematics fundamentally due to the notations of the numeral system and the common fraction. The numeral system has a place value notation with ten as base, and the concise notation of the common fraction is the one we still use today."

Almost nothing is known about the author Zhang Qiujian, sometimes written as Chang Ch'iu-Chin or Chang Ch'iu-chien. It is estimated that he lived from 430 to 490 CE, but there is no consensus.

== Contents ==
In its surviving form, the book has a preface and three chapters. There are two missing bits, one at the end of Chapter 1 and one at the beginning of Chapter 3. Chapter 1 consists of 32 problems, Chapter 2 of 22 problems and Chapter 3 of 38 problems. In the preface, the author has set forth his objectives in writing the book clearly. There are three objectives: The first is to explain how to handle arithmetical operations involving fractions; the second objective is to put forth new improved methods for solving old problems; and, the third objective is to present computational methods in a precise and comprehensible form.

Here is a typical problem of Chapter 1: "Divide 6587 2/3 and 3/4 by 58 ı/2. How much is it?" The answer is given as 112 437/702 with a detailed description of the process by which the answer is obtained. This description makes use of the Chinese rod numerals. The chapter considers several real world problems where computations with fractions appear naturally.

In Chapter 2, among others, there are a few problem requiring application of the rule of three. Here is a typical problem: "Now there was a person who stole a horse and rode off with it. After he has traveled 73 li, the owner realized [the theft] and gave chase for 145 li when [the thief] was 23 li ahead before turning back. If he had not turned back but continued to chase, find the distance in li before he reached [the thief]." Answer is given as 238 3/14 li.

In Chapter 3, there are several problems connected with volumes of solids which are granaries. Here is an example: "Now there is a pit [in the shape of the frustum of a pyramid] with a rectangular base. The width of the upper [rectangle] is 4 chi and the width of the lower [rectangle] is 7 chi. The length of the upper [rectangle] is 5 chi and the length of the lower [rectangle] is 8 chi. The depth is 1 zhang. Find the amount of millet that it can hold." However, the answer is given in a different set of units. The 37th problem is the "Washing Bowls Problem": "Now there was a woman washing cups by the river. An officer asked, "Why are there so many cups?" The woman replied, "There were guests in the house, but I do not know how many there were. However, every 2 persons had [a cup of] thick sauce, every 3 persons had [a cup of] soup and every 4 persons had [a cup of] rice; 65 cups were used altogether." Find the number of persons." The answer is given as 60 persons.

The last problem in the book is the famous Hundred Fowls Problem which is often considered as one of the earliest examples involving equations with indeterminate solutions. "Now one cock is worth 5 qian, one hen 3 qian and 3 chicks 1 qian. It is required to buy 100 fowls with 100 qian. In each case, find the number of cocks, hens and chicks bought."

== English translation ==
In 1969, Ang Tian Se, a student of University of Malaya, prepared an English translation of Zhang Qiujian Suanjing as part of the MA Dissertation. But the translation has not been published.
