= Bonse's inequality =

Inequality relating the primorial to square of the next prime number

In number theory, Bonse's inequality, named after H. Bonse, relates the size of a primorial to the smallest prime number that does not appear in its prime factorization. It states that for all $n\geq 4$, if $p_1,\dots,p_n,p_{n+1}$ are the first $n+1$ prime numbers, then

$$p_n\# = \prod_{i=1}^n p_i > p_{n+1}^2.$$

Barkley Rosser showed an upper bound where $n\#\leq 2.83^n$.

== See also ==
- Primorial prime
