= Primorial =

Product of the first "n" prime numbers

In mathematics, and more particularly in number theory, primorial, denoted by "$p_{n}\#$", is a function from natural numbers to natural numbers similar to the factorial function, but rather than successively multiplying positive integers, the function only multiplies prime numbers.

The name "primorial", coined by Harvey Dubner, draws an analogy to primes similar to the way the name "factorial" relates to factors.

== Definition for prime numbers ==
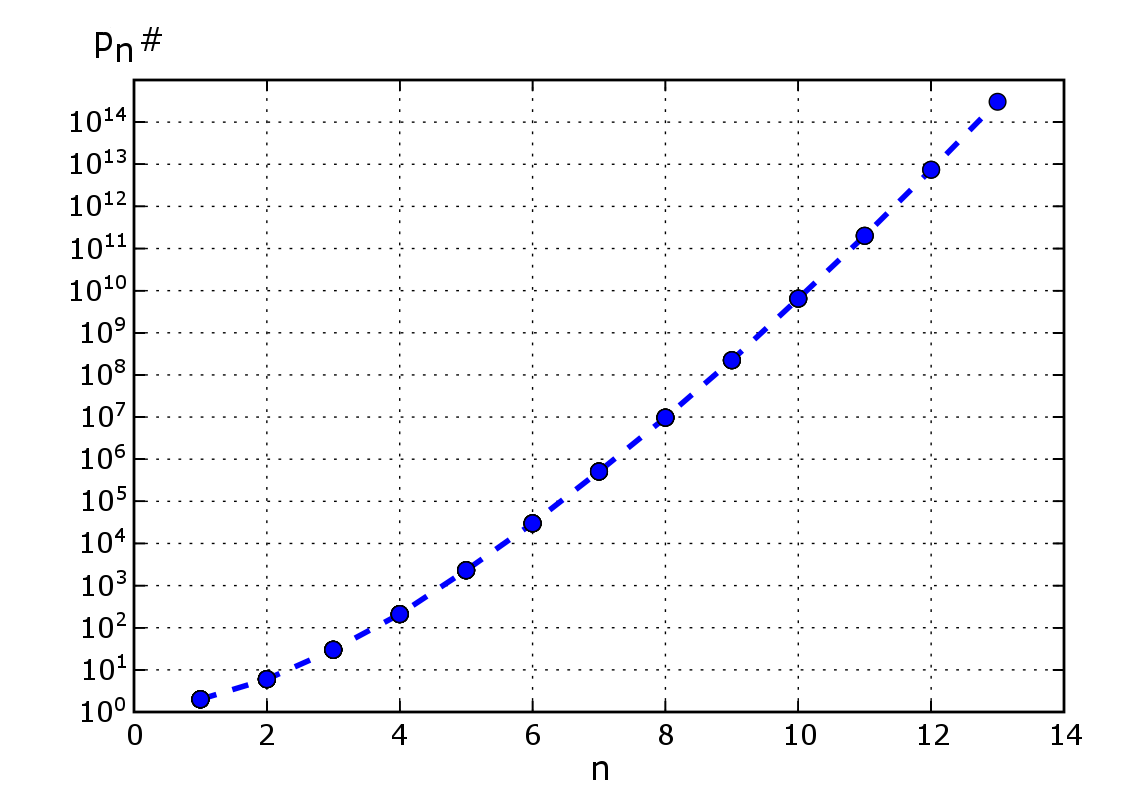
p_{n}# as a function of n, plotted logarithmically.

The primorial $p_n\#$ is defined as the product of the first $n$ primes:

$$p_n\# = \prod_{k=1}^n p_k,$$

where $p_k$ is the $k$th prime number. For instance, $p_5\#$ signifies the product of the first 5 primes:

$$p_5\# = 2 \times 3 \times 5 \times 7 \times 11= 2310.$$

The first few primorials $p_n\#$ are:

1, 2, 6, 30, 210, 2310, 30030, 510510, 9699690... (sequence A002110 in the OEIS).

Asymptotically, primorials grow according to

$$p_n\# = e^{(1 + o(1)) n \log n}.$$

== Definition for natural numbers ==
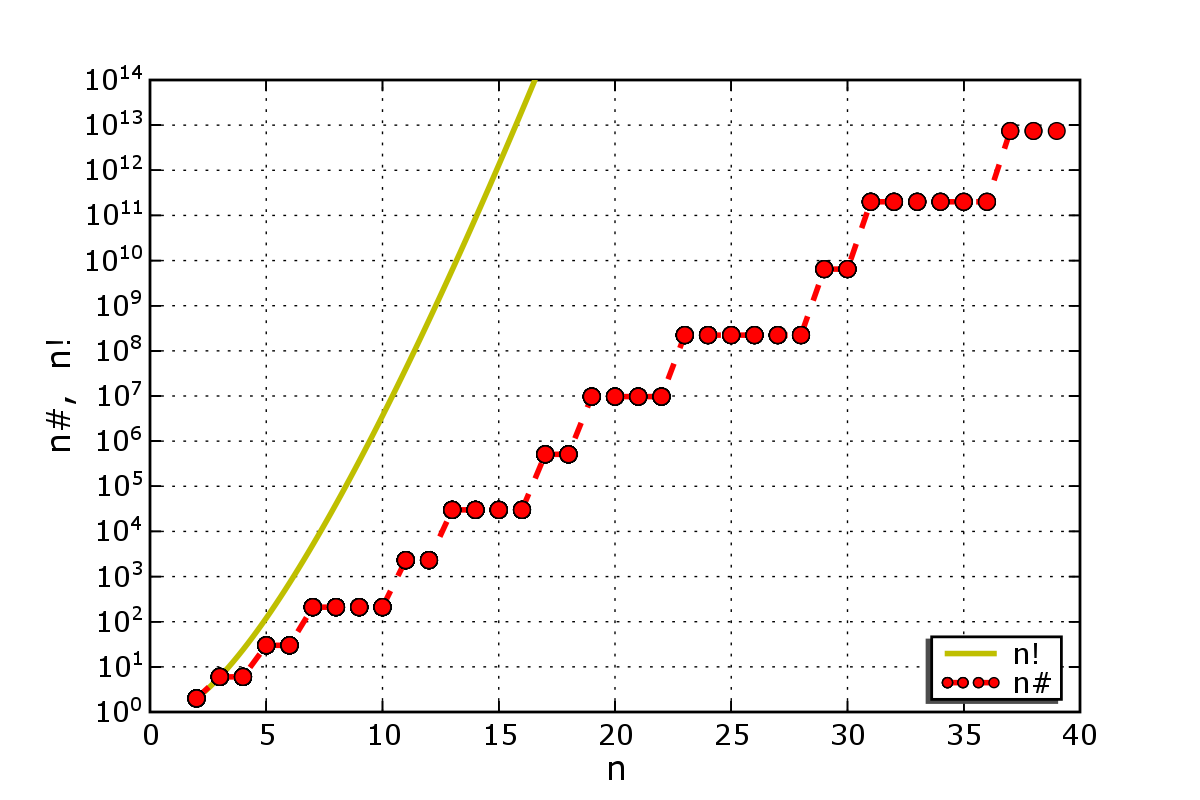
$n!$ (yellow) as a function of $n$, compared to $n\#$ (red), plotted logarithmically.

In general, for a positive integer $n$, its primorial $n\#$ is the product of all primes less than or equal to $n$; that is,

$$n\# = \prod_{p\,\leq\, n\atop p\,\text{prime}} p = \prod_{i=1}^{\pi(n)} p_i = p_{\pi(n)}\#,$$

where $\pi(n)$ is the prime-counting function (sequence A000720 in the OEIS). This is equivalent to

$$n\# =
\begin{cases}
1 & \text{if }n = 0,\ 1 \\
(n-1)\# \times n & \text{if } n \text{ is prime} \\
(n-1)\# & \text{if } n \text{ is composite}.
\end{cases}$$

For example, $12\#$ represents the product of all primes no greater than $12$:

$$12\# = 2 \times 3 \times 5 \times 7 \times 11= 2310.$$

Since $\pi(12)=5$, this can be calculated as:

$$12\# = p_{\pi(12)}\# = p_5\# = 2310.$$

Consider the first 12 values of the sequence $n\#$:

$$1, 2, 6, 6, 30, 30, 210, 210, 210, 210, 2310, 2310.$$

We see that for composite $n$, every term $n\#$ is equal to the preceding term $(n-1)\#$. In the above example we have $12\# = p_5\# = 11\#$ since $12$ is composite.

Primorials are related to the first Chebyshev function $\vartheta(n)$ by

$$\ln (n\#) = \vartheta(n).$$

Since $\vartheta(n)$ asymptotically approaches $n$ for large values of $n$, primorials therefore grow according to:

$$n\# = e^{(1+o(1))n}.$$

== Properties ==
- For any $n, p \in \mathbb{N}$, $n\#=p\#$ iff $p$ is the largest prime such that $p\leq n$.
- Let $p_k$ be the $k$th prime. Then $p_k\#$ has exactly $2^k$ divisors.
- The sum of the reciprocal values of the primorial converges towards a constant
  $\sum_{p\,\text{prime}} {1 \over p\#} = {1 \over 2} + {1 \over 6} + {1 \over 30} + \ldots = 0{.}7052301717918\ldots$ (sequence A064648 in the OEIS)

The Engel expansion of this number results in the sequence of the prime numbers. Griffiths (2015) proved that it is irrational.

- Euclid's proof of his theorem on the infinitude of primes can be paraphrased by saying that, for any prime $p$, the number $p\# +1$ has a prime divisor not contained in the set of primes less than or equal to $p$.
- $\lim_{n \to \infty}\sqrt[n]{n\#} = e$. For $n<10^{11}$, the values are smaller than $e$, but for larger $n$, the values of the function exceed $e$ and oscillate infinitely around $e$ later on.
- Since the binomial coefficient $\tbinom{2n}{n}$ is divisible by every prime between $n+1$ and $2n$, and since $\tbinom{2n}{n} \leq 4^{n}$, we have the following upper bound: $n\#\leq 4^n$.
  - Using elementary methods, Denis Hanson showed that $n\#\leq 3^n$.
  - Using more advanced methods, Rosser and Schoenfeld showed that $n\#\leq (2.763)^n$. Furthermore, they showed that for $n \ge 563$, $n\#\geq (2.22)^n$.

== Applications ==
Primorials play a role in the search for prime numbers in additive arithmetic progressions. For instance, $2 236 133 941+23\#$ results in a prime, beginning a sequence of thirteen primes found by repeatedly adding $23\#$, and ending with $5136341251$. $23\#$ is also the common difference in arithmetic progressions of fifteen and sixteen primes.

Every highly composite number is a product of primorials.

Primorials are all square-free integers, and each one has more distinct prime factors than any number smaller than it. For each primorial $n$, the fraction $\varphi(n)/n$ is smaller than for any positive integer less than $n$, where $\varphi$ is the Euler totient function.

Any completely multiplicative function is defined by its values at primorials, since it is defined by its values at primes, which can be recovered by division of adjacent values.

Base systems corresponding to primorials (such as base 30, not to be confused with the primorial number system) have a lower proportion of repeating fractions than any smaller base.

Every primorial is a sparsely totient number.

== Compositorial ==
The $n$-compositorial of a composite number $n$ is the product of all composite numbers up to and including $n$. The $n$-compositorial is equal to the $n$-factorial divided by the primorial $n\#$. The compositorials are

1, 4, 24, 192, 1728, 17280, 207360, 2903040, 43545600, 696729600, ...

== Riemann zeta function ==
The Riemann zeta function at positive integers greater than one can be expressed by using the primorial function and Jordan's totient function $J_k$:

$$\zeta(k)=\frac{2^k}{2^k-1}+\sum_{r=2}^\infty\frac{(p_{r-1}\#)^k}{J_k(p_r\#)},\quad k\in\Z_{>1}$$.

== Table of primorials ==
n	n#	p_{n}	p_{n}#	Primorial prime?	
n	n#	p_{n}	p_{n}#	p_{n}# + 1	p_{n}# − 1
0	1	—N/a	1	Yes	No
1	1	2	2	Yes	No
2	2	3	6	Yes	Yes
3	6	5	30	Yes	Yes
4	6	7	210	Yes	No
5	30	11	2310	Yes	Yes
6	30	13	30030	No	Yes
7	210	17	510510	No	No
8	210	19	9699690	No	No
9	210	23	223092870	No	No
10	210	29	6469693230	No	No
11	2310	31	200560490130	Yes	No
12	2310	37	7420738134810	No	No
13	30030	41	304250263527210	No	Yes
14	30030	43	13082761331670030	No	No
15	30030	47	614889782588491410	No	No
16	30030	53	32589158477190044730	No	No
17	510510	59	1922760350154212639070	No	No
18	510510	61	117288381359406970983270	No	No
19	9699690	67	7858321551080267055879090	No	No
20	9699690	71	557940830126698960967415390	No	No
21	9699690	73	40729680599249024150621323470	No	No
22	9699690	79	3217644767340672907899084554130	No	No
23	223092870	83	267064515689275851355624017992790	No	No
24	223092870	89	23768741896345550770650537601358310	No	Yes
25	223092870	97	2305567963945518424753102147331756070	No	No
26	223092870	101	232862364358497360900063316880507363070	No	No
27	223092870	103	23984823528925228172706521638692258396210	No	No
28	223092870	107	2566376117594999414479597815340071648394470	No	No
29	6469693230	109	279734996817854936178276161872067809674997230	No	No
30	6469693230	113	31610054640417607788145206291543662493274686990	No	No
31	200560490130	127	4014476939333036189094441199026045136645885247730	No	No
32	200560490130	131	525896479052627740771371797072411912900610967452630	No	No
33	200560490130	137	72047817630210000485677936198920432067383702541010310	No	No
34	200560490130	139	10014646650599190067509233131649940057366334653200433090	No	No
35	200560490130	149	1492182350939279320058875736615841068547583863326864530410	No	No
36	200560490130	151	225319534991831177328890236228992001350685163362356544091910	No	No
37	7420738134810	157	35375166993717494840635767087951744212057570647889977422429870	No	No
38	7420738134810	163	5766152219975951659023630035336134306565384015606066319856068810	No	No
39	7420738134810	167	962947420735983927056946215901134429196419130606213075415963491270	No	No
40	7420738134810	173	166589903787325219380851695350896256250980509594874862046961683989710	No	No

== See also ==
- Bonse's inequality
- Chebyshev function
- Primorial number system
- Primorial prime
- Scheherazade numbers
