= Meissel–Lehmer algorithm =

Prime-counting algorithm

The Meissel–Lehmer algorithm (after Ernst Meissel and Derrick Henry Lehmer) is an algorithm that computes exact values of the prime-counting function.

== Description ==
The problem of counting the exact number of primes less than or equal to x, without actually listing them all, dates from Legendre. He observed from the sieve of Eratosthenes that

$$\pi (x) - \pi (x^{1/2}) + 1 = \lfloor x \rfloor - \sum_{i} \lfloor x/p_i \rfloor + \sum_{i<j} \lfloor x/(p_ip_j) \rfloor - \ldots$$

where ⌊x⌋ denotes the floor of x (the greatest integer less than or equal to x), and the p_{i} run over all primes ≤ √x.

This formula is impractical to compute for large x, because the number of nonzero terms in the sum grows in proportion to x. In the 1870s Meissel found a more efficient method, based on recurrences for partial sieve functions, which reduces the number of terms in Legendre's sum. Lehmer extended and simplified it in 1959. These sieve functions are defined below.

=== Key functions ===
Let p_{1} = 2, p_{2} = 3, p_{3} = 5, … be the prime numbers in increasing order, and set p_{0} = 1. For an integer a ≥ 0, define

$$\varphi(x, a) := \left| \left \{ n \le x : p|n \implies p > p_a \right \} \right|,$$

which counts natural numbers no greater than x with all prime factors greater than p_{a}. Also define for an integer k ≥ 0,

$$P_k(x, a) := \left| \left \{ n \le x : n = q_1 q_2 \cdots q_k, ~\text{with primes}~ q_1, \ldots, q_k > p_a \right \} \right|,$$

which counts natural numbers no greater than x with exactly k prime factors (counted with multiplicity), all greater than p_{a}. With these, we have

$$\varphi(x, a) = \sum_{k=0}^\infty P_k(x, a),$$

where the sum only has finitely many nonzero terms because P_{k}(x, a) = 0 when p^{k}_{a+1} > x. Using the fact that P_{0}(x, a) = 1 and P_{1}(x, a) = π(x) − a, we get

$$\pi(x) = \varphi(x,a) + a - 1 - \sum_{k=2}^\infty P_k(x,a),$$

which proves that one may compute π(x) by computing φ(x,a) and P_{k}(x, a) for k ≥ 2. This is what the Meissel–Lehmer algorithm does.

=== Formula for P_{k}(x, a) ===
For k = 2, we get the following formula for P_{k}(x, a):

$$\begin{align}
P_2(x, a) & =\left| \left\{ n : n \le x,~ n = p_b p_c, ~\text{with}~ a < b \le c \right\} \right| \\
& = \sum_{b = a+1}^{\pi(x^{1/2})} \left| \left\{ n : n \le x,~ n = p_b p_c, ~\text{with}~ b \le c \le \pi \left( \frac{x}{p_b} \right) \right\} \right| \\
& = \sum_{b = a+1}^{\pi(x^{1/2})} \left( \pi\left( \frac{x}{p_b} \right) - (b-1) \right) \\
& = \binom{a}{2} - \binom{\pi(x^{1/2})}{2} + \sum_{b = a+1}^{\pi(x^{1/2})} \pi\left( \frac{x}{p_b} \right).
\end{align}$$

For k ≥ 3, the identities for P_{k}(x, a) can be derived similarly.

=== Expanding φ(x, a) ===
With the starting condition

$$\varphi(x, 0) = \lfloor x \rfloor,$$

and the recurrence

$$\varphi(x, a) = \varphi(x, a-1) - \varphi\left(\frac x {p_a}, a-1 \right),$$

each value for φ(x,a) can be calculated recursively.

=== Combining the terms ===
The only thing that remains to be done is evaluating φ(x,a) and P_{k}(x, a) for k ≥ 2, for certain values of x and a. This can be done by direct sieving and using the above formulas.

== History ==
Meissel already found that for k ≥ 3, P_{k}(x, a) = 0 if a = π(x^{1/3}). He used the resulting equation for calculations of π(x) for big values of x.

Meissel calculated π(x) for values of x up to 10^{9}, but he narrowly missed the correct result for the biggest value of x.

Using his method and an IBM 701, Lehmer was able to compute the correct value of π(10^{9}) and missed the correct value of π(10^{10}) by 1.

== Extended algorithm ==
Jeffrey Lagarias, Victor Miller and Andrew Odlyzko published a realisation of the algorithm which computes π(x) in time O(x^{2/3+ε}) and space O(x^{1/3+ε}) for any ε > 0. Upon setting a = π(x^{1/3}), the tree of φ(x,a) has O(x^{2/3}) leaf nodes.

This extended Meissel-Lehmer algorithm needs less computing time than the algorithm developed by Meissel and Lehmer, especially for big values of x.

Further improvements of the algorithm are given by M. Deleglise and J. Rivat in 1996 and X. Gourdon in 2001 (unpublished).
