= Cauchy product =

Mathematical operation

In mathematics, more specifically in mathematical analysis, the Cauchy product is the discrete convolution of two infinite series. It is named after the French mathematician Augustin-Louis Cauchy.

== Definitions ==
The Cauchy product may apply to infinite series or power series. When people apply it to finite sequences or finite series, that can be seen merely as a particular case of a product of series with a finite number of non-zero coefficients (see discrete convolution).

Convergence issues are discussed in the next section.

=== Cauchy product of two infinite series ===
Let $\sum_{i=0}^\infty a_i$ and $\sum_{j=0}^\infty b_j$ be two infinite series with complex terms. The Cauchy product of these two infinite series is defined by a discrete convolution as follows:

$\left(\sum_{i=0}^\infty a_i\right) \cdot \left(\sum_{j=0}^\infty b_j\right) = \sum_{k=0}^\infty c_k$ where $c_k=\sum_{l=0}^k a_l b_{k-l}$.

=== Cauchy product of two power series ===
Consider the following two power series

$\sum_{i=0}^\infty a_i x^i$ and $\sum_{j=0}^\infty b_j x^j$

with complex coefficients $\{a_i\}$ and $\{b_j\}$. The Cauchy product of these two power series is defined by a discrete convolution as follows:

$\left(\sum_{i=0}^\infty a_i x^i\right) \cdot \left(\sum_{j=0}^\infty b_j x^j\right) = \sum_{k=0}^\infty c_k x^k$ where $c_k=\sum_{l=0}^k a_l b_{k-l}$.

== Convergence and Mertens' theorem ==
Let (a_{n})_{n≥0} and (b_{n})_{n≥0} be real or complex sequences. It was proved by Franz Mertens that, if the series $\sum_{n=0}^\infty a_n$ converges to A and $\sum_{n=0}^\infty b_n$ converges to B, and at least one of them converges absolutely, then their Cauchy product converges to AB. The theorem is still valid in a Banach algebra (see first line of the following proof).

It is not sufficient for both series to be convergent; if both sequences are conditionally convergent, the Cauchy product does not have to converge towards the product of the two series, as the following example shows:

=== Example ===
Consider the two alternating series with

$$a_n = b_n = \frac{(-1)^n}{\sqrt{n+1}}\,,$$

which are only conditionally convergent (the divergence of the series of the absolute values follows from the direct comparison test and the divergence of the harmonic series). The terms of their Cauchy product are given by

$$c_n = \sum_{k=0}^n \frac{(-1)^k}{\sqrt{k+1}} \cdot \frac{ (-1)^{n-k} }{ \sqrt{n-k+1} } = (-1)^n \sum_{k=0}^n \frac{1}{ \sqrt{(k+1)(n-k+1)} }$$

for every integer n ≥ 0. Since for every k ∈ {0, 1, ..., n} we have the inequalities k + 1 ≤ n + 1 and n – k + 1 ≤ n + 1, it follows for the square root in the denominator that √(k + 1)(n − k + 1) ≤ n +1, hence, because there are n + 1 summands,

$$|c_n| \ge \sum_{k=0}^n \frac{1}{n+1} = 1$$

for every integer n ≥ 0. Therefore, c_{n} does not converge to zero as n → ∞, hence the series of the (c_{n})_{n≥0} diverges by the term test.

=== Proof of Mertens' theorem ===
For simplicity, we will prove it for complex numbers. However, the proof we are about to give is formally identical for an arbitrary Banach algebra (not even commutativity or associativity is required).

Assume without loss of generality that the series $\sum_{n=0}^\infty a_n$ converges absolutely. Define the partial sums

$$A_n = \sum_{i=0}^n a_i,\quad B_n = \sum_{i=0}^n b_i\quad\text{and}\quad C_n = \sum_{i=0}^n c_i$$

with

$$c_i=\sum_{k=0}^ia_kb_{i-k}\,.$$

Then

$$C_n = \sum_{i=0}^n  a_{n-i}B_i$$

by rearrangement, hence

$C_n = A_nB+\sum_{i=0}^na_{n-i}(B_i-B)\,.$	1

Fix ε > 0. Since $\sum_{k \in \N} |a_k| < \infty$ by absolute convergence, and since B_{n} converges to B as n → ∞, there exists an integer N such that, for all integers n ≥ N,

$|B_n-B|\le\frac{\varepsilon/3}{\sum_{ k \in \N } |a_k|+1}$	2

(this is the only place where the absolute convergence is used). Since the series of the (a_{n})_{n≥0} converges, the individual a_{n} must converge to 0 by the term test. Hence there exists an integer M such that, for all integers n ≥ M,

$|a_n|\le\frac{\varepsilon}{3N(\max_{ i\in\{0,\dots,N-1\} } |B_i-B|+1)}\,.$	3

Also, since A_{n} converges to A as n → ∞, there exists an integer L such that, for all integers n ≥ L,

$|A_n-A|\le\frac{\varepsilon/3}{|B|+1}\,.$	4

Then, for all integers n ≥ max{L, M + N}, use the representation (1) for C_{n}, split the sum in two parts, use the triangle inequality for the absolute value, and finally use the three estimates (2), (3) and (4) to show that

$$\begin{align}
|C_n - AB| &= \biggl|(A_n-A)B+\sum_{i=0}^n a_{n-i}(B_i-B)\biggr| \\
&\le {}\underbrace{|A_n-A|\,|B|}_{\le\,\varepsilon/3\text{ by (4)}}+\underbrace{\sum_{i=0}^{N-1}|a_{\underbrace{\scriptstyle n-i}_{\scriptscriptstyle \ge M}}|\,|B_i-B|}_{\le\,\varepsilon/3\text{ by (3)}}+{}\underbrace{\sum_{i=N}^n |a_{n-i}|\,|B_i-B|}_{\le\,\varepsilon/3\text{ by (2)}}\le\varepsilon\,.
\end{align}$$

By the definition of convergence of a series, C_{n} → AB as required.

== Cesàro's theorem ==
In cases where the two sequences are convergent but not absolutely convergent, the Cauchy product is still Cesàro summable. Specifically:

If $(a_n)_{n \geq 0}$, $(b_n)_{n \geq 0}$ are real sequences with $\sum a_n\to A$ and $\sum b_n\to B$ then

$$\frac{1}{N}\left(\sum_{n=1}^N\sum_{i=1}^n\sum_{k=0}^i a_k b_{i-k}\right)\to AB.$$

This can be generalised to the case where the two sequences are not convergent but just Cesàro summable:

=== Theorem ===
For $r>-1$ and $s>-1$, suppose the sequence $(a_n)_{n \geq 0}$ is $(C,\; r)$ summable with sum A and $(b_n)_{n \geq 0}$ is $(C,\; s)$ summable with sum B. Then their Cauchy product is $(C,\; r+s+1)$ summable with sum AB.

== Examples ==
- For some $x,y \in \Reals$, let $a_n = x^n/n!$ and $b_n = y^n/n!$. Then
  $$c_n = \sum_{i=0}^n\frac{x^i}{i!}\frac{y^{n-i}}{(n-i)!} = \frac{1}{n!} \sum_{i=0}^n \binom{n}{i} x^i y^{n-i} = \frac{(x+y)^n}{n!}$$
  by definition and the binomial formula. Since, formally, $\exp(x) = \sum a_n$ and $\exp(y) = \sum b_n$, we have shown that $\exp(x+y) = \sum c_n$. Since the limit of the Cauchy product of two absolutely convergent series is equal to the product of the limits of those series, we have proven the formula $\exp(x+y) = \exp(x)\exp(y)$ for all $x,y \in \Reals$.
- As a second example, let $a_n = b_n = 1$ for all $n \in \N$. Then $c_n = n+1$ for all $n \in \N$ so the Cauchy product
  $$\sum c_n = (1,1+2,1+2+3,1+2+3+4,\dots)$$
  does not converge.

== Generalizations ==
All of the foregoing applies to sequences in $\Complex$ (complex numbers). The Cauchy product can be defined for series in the $\R^n$ spaces (Euclidean spaces) where multiplication is the inner product. In this case, we have the result that if two series converge absolutely then their Cauchy product converges absolutely to the inner product of the limits.

=== Products of finitely many infinite series ===
Let $n \in \N$ such that $n \ge 2$ (actually the following is also true for $n=1$ but the statement becomes trivial in that case) and let $\sum_{k_1 = 0}^\infty a_{1, k_1}, \ldots, \sum_{k_n = 0}^\infty a_{n, k_n}$ be infinite series with complex coefficients, from which all except the $n$th one converge absolutely, and the $n$th one converges. Then the limit
$$\lim_{N\to\infty}\sum_{k_1+\ldots+k_n\leq N} a_{1,k_1}\cdots a_{n,k_n}$$
exists and we have:
$$\prod_{j=1}^n \left( \sum_{k_j = 0}^\infty a_{j, k_j} \right)=\lim_{N\to\infty}\sum_{k_1+\ldots+k_n\leq N} a_{1,k_1}\cdots a_{n,k_n}$$

=== Proof ===
Because
$$\forall N\in\mathbb N:\sum_{k_1+\ldots+k_n\leq N}a_{1,k_1}\cdots a_{n,k_n}=\sum_{k_1 = 0}^N \sum_{k_2 = 0}^{k_1} \cdots \sum_{k_n = 0}^{k_{n-1}}a_{1, k_n} a_{2, k_{n-1} - k_n} \cdots a_{n, k_1 - k_2}$$
the statement can be proven by induction over $n$: The case for $n = 2$ is identical to the claim about the Cauchy product. This is our induction base.

The induction step goes as follows: Let the claim be true for an $n \in \N$ such that $n \ge 2$, and let $\sum_{k_1 = 0}^\infty a_{1, k_1}, \ldots, \sum_{k_{n+1} = 0}^\infty a_{n+1, k_{n+1}}$ be infinite series with complex coefficients, from which all except the $n+1$th one converge absolutely, and the $n+1$-th one converges. We first apply the induction hypothesis to the series $\sum_{k_1 = 0}^\infty |a_{1, k_1}|, \ldots, \sum_{k_n = 0}^\infty |a_{n, k_n}|$. We obtain that the series
$$\sum_{k_1 = 0}^\infty \sum_{k_2 = 0}^{k_1} \cdots \sum_{k_n = 0}^{k_{n-1}} |a_{1, k_n} a_{2, k_{n-1} - k_n} \cdots a_{n, k_1 - k_2}|$$
converges, and hence, by the triangle inequality and the sandwich criterion, the series
$$\sum_{k_1 = 0}^\infty \left| \sum_{k_2 = 0}^{k_1} \cdots \sum_{k_n = 0}^{k_{n-1}} a_{1, k_n} a_{2, k_{n-1} - k_n} \cdots a_{n, k_1 - k_2} \right|$$
converges, and hence the series
$$\sum_{k_1 = 0}^\infty \sum_{k_2 = 0}^{k_1} \cdots \sum_{k_n = 0}^{k_{n-1}} a_{1, k_n} a_{2, k_{n-1} - k_n} \cdots a_{n, k_1 - k_2}$$
converges absolutely. Therefore, by the induction hypothesis, by what Mertens proved, and by renaming of variables, we have:
$$\begin{align}
\prod_{j=1}^{n+1} \left( \sum_{k_j = 0}^\infty a_{j, k_j} \right) & = \left( \sum_{k_{n+1} = 0}^\infty \overbrace{a_{n+1, k_{n+1}}}^{=:a_{k_{n+1}}} \right) \left( \sum_{k_1 = 0}^\infty \overbrace{\sum_{k_2 = 0}^{k_1} \cdots \sum_{k_n = 0}^{k_{n-1}} a_{1, k_n} a_{2, k_{n-1} - k_n} \cdots a_{n, k_1 - k_2}}^{=:b_{k_1}} \right) \\
& =  \left( \sum_{k_1 = 0}^\infty \overbrace{\sum_{k_2 = 0}^{k_1} \sum_{k_3 = 0}^{k_2} \cdots \sum_{k_n = 0}^{k_{n-1}} a_{1, k_n} a_{2, k_{n-1} - k_n} \cdots a_{n, k_1 - k_2}}^{=:a_{k_1}} \right) \left ( \sum_{k_{n+1} = 0}^\infty \overbrace{a_{n+1, k_{n+1}}}^{=:b_{k_{n+1}}} \right)  \\
& =  \left( \sum_{k_1 = 0}^\infty \overbrace{\sum_{k_3 = 0}^{k_1} \sum_{k_4 = 0}^{k_3} \cdots \sum_{k_n+1 = 0}^{k_{n}} a_{1, k_{n+1}} a_{2, k_{n} - k_{n+1}} \cdots a_{n, k_1 - k_3}}^{=:a_{k_1}} \right) \left ( \sum_{k_{2} = 0}^\infty \overbrace{a_{n+1, k_{2}}}^{=:b_{n+1,k_{2}}=:b_{k_{2}}} \right)  \\
& =  \left( \sum_{k_1 = 0}^\infty a_{k_1} \right) \left ( \sum_{k_{2} = 0}^\infty b_{k_2} \right)  \\
& =  \left( \sum_{k_1 = 0}^\infty \sum_{k_{2} = 0}^{k_1} a_{k_2}b_{k_1 - k_2} \right)  \\
& =  \left( \sum_{k_1 = 0}^\infty \sum_{k_{2} = 0}^{k_1} \left ( \overbrace{\sum_{k_3 = 0}^{k_2} \cdots \sum_{k_n+1 = 0}^{k_{n}} a_{1, k_{n+1}} a_{2, k_{n} - k_{n+1}} \cdots a_{n, k_2 - k_3}}^{=:a_{k_2}} \right) \left ( \overbrace{a_{n+1, k_1 - k_2}}^{=:b_{k_1 - k_2}}  \right) \right)  \\
& =  \left( \sum_{k_1 = 0}^\infty \sum_{k_{2} = 0}^{k_1}  \overbrace{\sum_{k_3 = 0}^{k_2} \cdots \sum_{k_n+1 = 0}^{k_{n}} a_{1, k_{n+1}} a_{2, k_{n} - k_{n+1}} \cdots a_{n, k_2 - k_3}}^{=:a_{k_2}} \overbrace{a_{n+1, k_1 - k_2}}^{=:b_{k_1 - k_2}}   \right)  \\
& = \sum_{k_1 = 0}^\infty \sum_{k_2 = 0}^{k_1} a_{n+1, k_1 - k_2} \sum_{k_3 = 0}^{k_2} \cdots \sum_{k_{n+1} = 0}^{k_n} a_{1, k_{n+1}} a_{2, k_n - k_{n+1}} \cdots a_{n, k_2 - k_3}
\end{align}$$
Therefore, the formula also holds for $n+1$.

== Relation to convolution of functions ==
A finite sequence can be viewed as an infinite sequence with only finitely many nonzero terms, or in other words as a function $f: \N \to \Complex$ with finite support. For any complex-valued functions f, g on $\N$ with finite support, one can take their convolution:
$$(f * g)(n) = \sum_{i + j = n} f(i) g(j).$$
Then $\sum (f *g)(n)$ is the same thing as the Cauchy product of $\sum f(n)$ and $\sum g(n)$.

More generally, given a monoid S, one can form the semigroup algebra $\Complex[S]$ of S, with the multiplication given by convolution. If one takes, for example, $S = \N^d$, then the multiplication on $\Complex[S]$ is a generalization of the Cauchy product to higher dimension.
