= Meissel–Mertens constant =

Mathematical constant

In the limit, the sum of the reciprocals of the primes $\leq n$ and the function $\ln(\ln n)$ are separated by a constant, the Meissel–Mertens constant M.

In mathematics, the Meissel–Mertens constant, named after Ernst Meissel and Franz Mertens, also referred to as the Mertens constant, Kronecker's constant (after Leopold Kronecker), the Hadamard–de la Vallée-Poussin constant (after Jacques Hadamard and Charles Jean de la Vallée-Poussin), or the prime reciprocal constant, is a mathematical constant that arises in number theory. It is defined as the limiting difference between the harmonic series summed over the primes and the natural logarithm of the natural logarithm:

$$M = \lim_{n \to \infty } \bigg(
\sum_{\scriptstyle p\text{ prime}\atop \scriptstyle p\le n} \frac{1}{p}  - \ln(\ln n) \bigg)=\gamma + \sum_{p\text{ prime}} \left[ \ln\! \left( 1 - \frac{1}{p} \right) + \frac{1}{p} \right],$$

where $\gamma$ is the Euler–Mascheroni constant. Mertens' second theorem establishes that the limit exists. The value of $M$ is approximately

$M \approx 0.261497212847642783755\dots$ (sequence A077761 in the OEIS).

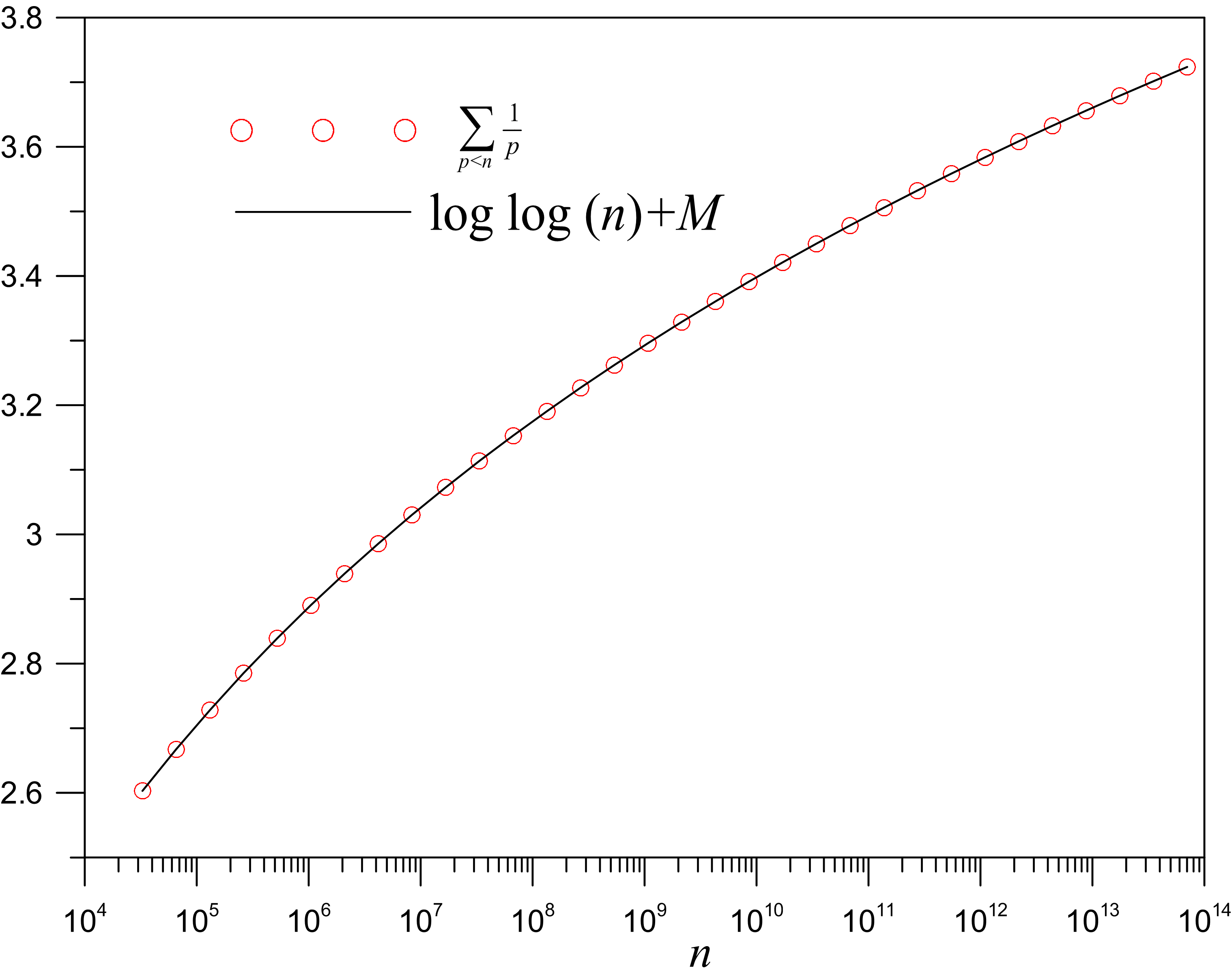
The plot of the prime harmonic sum up to $n=2^{15}, 2^{16}, \ldots, 2^{46} \approx 7.04 \times 10^{13}$ and the Mertens approximation to it. If the $n$-axis was plotted linearly instead of logarithmically, then the figure would be $5.\overline{33} \times 10^9$ km long—approximately the distance to Neptune.

The fact that there are two logarithms (log of a log) in the limit for the Meissel–Mertens constant may be thought of as a consequence of the combination of the prime number theorem and the limit of the Euler–Mascheroni constant.

== In popular culture ==
The Meissel-Mertens constant was used by Google when bidding in the Nortel patent auction. Google posted three bids based on mathematical numbers: first $1,902,160,540 (Brun's constant), then $2,614,972,128 (the Meissel–Mertens constant), and lastly $3.14159 billion (π).

== See also ==
- Divergence of the sum of the reciprocals of the primes
- Prime zeta function
- Lindqvist, Peter; Peetre, Jaak (1997). "On the remainder in a series of Mertens". Expositiones Mathematicae. 15 (5): 467–478. hdl:11250/4522251. Zbl 0958.11081.
- Meissel (1870). "Ueber die Bestimmung der Primzahlenmenge innerhalb gegebener Grenzen". Mathematische Annalen (in German). 2 (4): 636–642. doi:10.1007/BF01444045.
- Mertens (1874). "Ein Beitrag zur analytischen Zahlentheorie". Journal für die reine und angewandte Mathematik (in German). 78: 46–62. doi:10.1515/crll.1874.78.46.
