= Digital root =

Repeated sum of a number's digits

The digital root (also repeated digital sum) of a natural number in a given radix is the (single digit) value obtained by an iterative process of summing digits, on each iteration using the result from the previous iteration to compute a digit sum. The process continues until a single-digit number is reached. For example, in base 10, the digital root of the number 12345 is 6 because the sum of the digits in the number is 1 + 2 + 3 + 4 + 5 = 15, then the addition process is repeated for the resulting number 15, so that the sum of 1 + 5 equals 6, which is the digital root of that number. In base 10, this is equivalent to taking the remainder upon division by 9 (except when the digital root is 9, where the remainder upon division by 9 will be 0), which allows it to be used as a divisibility rule. Generally, the digital root computed in integer base b ≥ 2 of a non-negative integer n satisfies

$$\mathrm{dr}_b(n) = \begin{cases}  0 & n=0 \\  1 + ((n - 1) \bmod (b - 1)) & n > 0\,.\end{cases}$$

== Formal definition ==
Let $n$ be a natural number. For base $b > 1$, we define the digit sum $F_{b} : \mathbb{N} \rightarrow \mathbb{N}$ to be the following:

$$F_{b}(n) = \sum_{i=0}^{k - 1} d_i$$

where $k = \lfloor \log_{b}{n} \rfloor + 1$ is the number of digits in the number in base $b$, and

$$d_i = \frac{n \bmod{b^{i+1}} - n \bmod b^i}{b^i}$$

is the value of each digit of the number. A natural number $n$ is a digital root if it is a fixed point for $F_{b}$; that is, when $F_{b}(n) = n$.

All natural numbers $n$ are preperiodic points for $F_{b}$, regardless of the base. This is because if $n \geq b$, then

$$n = \sum_{i=0}^{k - 1} d_i b^i$$

and therefore

$$F_{b}(n) = \sum_{i=0}^{k - 1} d_i < \sum_{i=0}^{k - 1} d_i b^i = n$$

because $b > 1$. If $n < b$, then trivially

$$F_{b}(n) = n$$

Therefore, the only possible digital roots are the natural numbers $0 \leq n < b$, and there are no cycles other than the fixed points of $0 \leq n < b$.

=== Example ===
In base 12, 8 is the additive digital root of the base 10 number 3110, as for $n = 3110$

$$d_0 = \frac{3110 \bmod{12^{0+1}} - 3110 \bmod 12^0}{12^0} = \frac{3110 \bmod{12} - 3110 \bmod 1}{1} = \frac{2 - 0}{1} = \frac{2}{1} = 2$$
$$d_1 = \frac{3110 \bmod{12^{1+1}} - 3110 \bmod 12^1}{12^1} = \frac{3110 \bmod{144} - 3110 \bmod 12}{12} = \frac{86 - 2}{12} = \frac{84}{12} = 7$$
$$d_2 = \frac{3110 \bmod{12^{2+1}} - 3110 \bmod 12^2}{12^2} = \frac{3110 \bmod{1728} - 3110 \bmod 144}{144} = \frac{1382 - 86}{144} = \frac{1296}{144} = 9$$
$$d_3 = \frac{3110 \bmod{12^{3+1}} - 3110 \bmod 12^3}{12^3} = \frac{3110 \bmod{20736} - 3110 \bmod 1728}{1728} = \frac{3110 - 1382}{1728} = \frac{1728}{1728} = 1$$
$$F_{12}(3110) = \sum_{i=0}^{4 - 1} d_i = 2 + 7 + 9 + 1 = 19$$

This process shows that 3110 is 1972 in base 12. Now for $F_{12}(3110) = 19$

$$d_0 = \frac{19 \bmod{12^{0+1}} - 19 \bmod 12^0}{12^0} = \frac{19 \bmod{12} - 19 \bmod 1}{1} = \frac{7 - 0}{1} = \frac{7}{1} = 7$$
$$d_1 = \frac{19 \bmod{12^{1+1}} - 19 \bmod 12^1}{12^1} = \frac{19 \bmod{144} - 19 \bmod 12}{12} = \frac{19 - 7}{12} = \frac{12}{12} = 1$$
$$F_{12}(19) = \sum_{i=0}^{2 - 1} d_i = 1 + 7 = 8$$

shows that 19 is 17 in base 12. And as 8 is a 1-digit number in base 12,

$$F_{12}(8) = 8$$.

== Direct formulas ==
We can define the digit root $\operatorname{dr}_{b} : \mathbb{N} \rightarrow \mathbb{N}$ directly for base $b \ge 2$ in the following ways:

=== Congruence formula ===
The formula in base $b$ is:

$$\operatorname{dr}_{b}(n) =
\begin{cases}
0 & \mbox{if}\ n = 0, \\
b - 1 & \mbox{if}\ n \neq 0,\ n\ \equiv 0 \pmod{(b - 1)},\\
n \bmod{(b - 1)} & \mbox{if}\ n \not\equiv 0 \pmod{(b - 1)}
\end{cases}$$

or,

$$\operatorname{dr}_{b}(n) =
\begin{cases}
0 & \mbox{if}\ n = 0, \\
1\ +\ ((n-1) \bmod{(b - 1)}) & \mbox{if}\ n \neq 0.
\end{cases}$$

In base 10, the corresponding sequence is (sequence A010888 in the OEIS).

The digital root is the value modulo $(b - 1)$ because $b \equiv 1 \pmod{(b - 1)},$ and thus $b^i \equiv 1^i \equiv 1 \pmod{(b - 1)}.$ So regardless of the position $i$ of digit $d_i$, $d_i b^i\equiv d_i \pmod{(b-1)}$, which explains why digits can be meaningfully added. Concretely, for a three-digit number $n = d_2 b^2 + d_1 b^1 + d_0 b^0$,

$$\operatorname{dr}_{b}(n) \equiv d_2 b^2 + d_1 b^1 + d_0 b^0 \equiv d_2 (1) + d_1 (1) + d_0 (1) \equiv d_2 + d_1 + d_0 \pmod{(b - 1)}.$$

To obtain the modular value with respect to other numbers $m$, one can take weighted sums, where the weight on the $i$-th digit corresponds to the value of $b^i \bmod{m}$. In base 10, this is simplest for $m=2, 5,\text{ and }10$, where higher digits except for the unit digit vanish (since 2 and 5 divide powers of 10), which corresponds to the familiar fact that the divisibility of a decimal number with respect to 2, 5, and 10 can be checked by the last digit.

Also of note is the modulus $m = b + 1$. Since $b \equiv -1 \pmod{(b + 1)},$ and thus $b^2 \equiv (-1)^2 \equiv 1 \pmod{(b + 1)},$ taking the alternating sum of digits yields the value modulo $(b + 1)$.

=== Using the floor function ===
It helps to see the digital root of a positive integer as the position it holds with respect to the largest multiple of $b - 1$ less than the number itself. For example, in base 6 the digital root of 11 is 2, which means that 11 is the second number after $6 - 1 = 5$. Likewise, in base 10 the digital root of 2035 is 1, which means that $2035 - 1 = 2034|9$. If a number produces a digital root of exactly $b - 1$, then the number is a multiple of $b - 1$.

With this in mind the digital root of a positive integer $n$ may be defined by using floor function $\lfloor x\rfloor$, as

$$\operatorname{dr}_{b}(n)=n-(b - 1)\left\lfloor\frac{n-1}{b - 1}\right\rfloor.$$

== Properties ==
Let $b \ge 2$ and let $\operatorname{dr}_b(n)$ denote the digital root of $n$ in base $b$. Then:

- Idempotence

$$\operatorname{dr}_b(\operatorname{dr}_b(n)) = \operatorname{dr}_b(n).$$

Since the digital root is a single digit (i.e. $0 \le \operatorname{dr}_b(n) < b$), applying the digit-sum process again leaves it unchanged.

- Compatibility with addition

$$\operatorname{dr}_b(a + c) = \operatorname{dr}_b(\operatorname{dr}_b(a) + \operatorname{dr}_b(c)).$$

This follows from the congruence

$$a \equiv \operatorname{dr}_b(a), \quad c \equiv \operatorname{dr}_b(c) \pmod{b-1}.$$

- Compatibility with subtraction

$$\operatorname{dr}_b(a - c) \equiv \operatorname{dr}_b(a) - \operatorname{dr}_b(c) \pmod{b-1}.$$

In particular, after applying $\operatorname{dr}_b$ to the result, subtraction is preserved up to reduction modulo $b-1$.

- Compatibility with multiplication

$$\operatorname{dr}_b(ac) = \operatorname{dr}_b(\operatorname{dr}_b(a)\cdot \operatorname{dr}_b(c)).$$

This is a consequence of multiplicative compatibility modulo $b-1$.

- Compatibility with exponentiation

$$\operatorname{dr}_b(a^k) = \operatorname{dr}_b(\operatorname{dr}_b(a)^k).$$

This follows from

$$a \equiv \operatorname{dr}_b(a) \pmod{b-1}$$,

so

$$a^k \equiv \operatorname{dr}_b(a)^k \pmod{b-1}.$$

These properties show that the digital root behaves like reduction modulo $b-1$, followed by mapping the residue $0$ to $b-1$.

== Additive persistence ==
The additive persistence counts how many times we must sum its digits to arrive at its digital root.

For example, the additive persistence of 2718 in base 10 is 2: first we find that 2 + 7 + 1 + 8 = 18, then that 1 + 8 = 9.

There is no limit to the additive persistence of a number in a number base $b$. Proof: For a given number $n$, the persistence of the number consisting of $n$ repetitions of the digit 1 is 1 higher than that of $n$. The smallest numbers of additive persistence 0, 1, ... in base 10 are:

0, 10, 19, 199, 19 999 999 999 999 999 999 999, ... (sequence A006050 in the OEIS)

The next number in the sequence (the smallest number of additive persistence 5) is 2 × 10^{2×(10^{22} − 1)/9} − 1 (that is, 1 followed by 2 222 222 222 222 222 222 222 nines). For any fixed base, the sum of the digits of a number is proportional to its logarithm; therefore, the additive persistence is proportional to the iterated logarithm.

== Programming example ==
The example below implements the digit sum described in the definition above to search for digital roots and additive persistences in Java.

import java.util.HashSet;

public class DigitFunctions {

    // Sum of digits in base b
    static int digitSum(int x, int b) {
        int total = 0;
        while (x > 0) {
            total += x % b;
            x /= b;
        }
        return total;
    }

    // Digital root in base b
    static int digitalRoot(int x, int b) {
        HashSet<Integer> seen = new HashSet<>();
        while (!seen.contains(x)) {
            seen.add(x);
            x = digitSum(x, b);
        }
        return x;
    }

    // Additive persistence in base b
    static int additivePersistence(int x, int b) {
        HashSet<Integer> seen = new HashSet<>();
        while (!seen.contains(x)) {
            seen.add(x);
            x = digitSum(x, b);
        }
        return seen.size() - 1;
    }

    // Example usage
    public static void main(String[] args) {
        int x = 9876;
        int b = 10;

        System.out.println("Digit Sum: " + digitSum(x, b));
        System.out.println("Digital Root: " + digitalRoot(x, b));
        System.out.println("Additive Persistence: " + additivePersistence(x, b));
    }
}

== In popular culture ==
Digital roots are used in Western numerology, but certain numbers deemed to have occult significance (such as 11 and 22) are not always completely reduced to a single digit.

Digital roots form an important mechanic in the visual novel adventure game Nine Hours, Nine Persons, Nine Doors.

== See also ==
- Arithmetic dynamics
- Base 9
- Casting out nines
- Digit sum
- Divisibility rule
- Hamming weight
- Multiplicative digital root
- Vedic square
