= Factorial prime =

Prime number one less or more than a factorial

- No. of known terms: 53
- Conjectured no. of terms: Infinite
- Subsequence of: n! ± 1
- First terms: 2, 3, 5, 7, 23, 719, 5039, 39916801, 479001599, 87178291199
- Largest known term: 632760! − 1
- OEIS index: A088054

A factorial prime is a prime number that is one less or one more than a factorial (all factorials greater than 1 are even).

The first 10 factorial primes (for n = 1, 2, 3, 4, 6, 7, 11, 12, 14) are (sequence A088054 in the OEIS):

2 (0! + 1 or 1! + 1), 3 (2! + 1), 5 (3! − 1), 7 (3! + 1), 23 (4! − 1), 719 (6! − 1), 5039 (7! − 1), 39916801 (11! + 1), 479001599 (12! − 1), 87178291199 (14! − 1), ...

n! − 1 is prime for (sequence A002982 in the OEIS):

n = 3, 4, 6, 7, 12, 14, 30, 32, 33, 38, 94, 166, 324, 379, 469, 546, 974, 1963, 3507, 3610, 6917, 21480, 34790, 94550, 103040, 147855, 208003, 632760. (resulting in 28 factorial primes)

n! + 1 is prime for (sequence A002981 in the OEIS):

n = 0, 1, 2, 3, 11, 27, 37, 41, 73, 77, 116, 154, 320, 340, 399, 427, 872, 1477, 6380, 26951, 110059, 150209, 288465, 308084, 422429. (resulting in 24 unique factorial primes - the prime 2 occurs twice)

No other factorial primes are known as of June 2025.

When both n! + 1 and n! − 1 are composite, there must be at least 2n + 1 consecutive composite numbers around n!, since besides n! ± 1 and n! itself, also, each number of form n! ± k is divisible by k for 2 ≤ k ≤ n. However, the necessary length of this gap is asymptotically smaller than the average composite run for integers of similar size (see prime gap).

== See also ==
- Primorial prime
