= Primorial prime =

Prime number that is product of first n primes ± 1

- No. of known terms: 52
- Conjectured no. of terms: Infinite
- Subsequence of: p# ± 1
- First terms: 2, 3, 5, 7, 29, 31, 211, 2309, 2311, 30029, 200560490131, 304250263527209, 23768741896345550770650537601358309
- Largest known term: 9562633# + 1
- OEIS index: A228486

In mathematics, a primorial prime is a prime number of the form p_{n}# ± 1, where p_{n}# is the primorial of p_{n} (i.e. the product of the first n primes).

Primality tests show that:

p_{n}# − 1 is prime for n = 2, 3, 5, 6, 13, 24, 66, 68, 167, 287, 310, 352, 564, 590, 620, 849, 1552, 1849, 67132, 85586, 234725, 334023, 435582, 446895, ... (sequence A057704 in the OEIS). (p_{n} = 3, 5, 11, 13, 41, 89, 317, 337, 991, 1873, 2053, 2377, 4093, 4297, 4583, 6569, 13033, 15877, 843301, 1098133, 3267113, 4778027, 6354977, 6533299, ... (sequence A006794 in the OEIS))
p_{n}# + 1 is prime for n = 0, 1, 2, 3, 4, 5, 11, 75, 171, 172, 384, 457, 616, 643, 1391, 1613, 2122, 2647, 2673, 4413, 13494, 31260, 33237, 304723, 365071, 436504, 498865, 637491, ... (sequence A014545 in the OEIS). (p_{n} = 1, 2, 3, 5, 7, 11, 31, 379, 1019, 1021, 2657, 3229, 4547, 4787, 11549, 13649, 18523, 23801, 24029, 42209, 145823, 366439, 392113, 4328927, 5256037, 6369619, 7351117, 9562633, ..., (sequence A005234 in the OEIS))

The first term of the third sequence is 0 because p_{0}# = 1 (we also let p_{0} = 1, see Primality of one , hence the first term of the fourth sequence is 1) is the empty product, and thus p_{0}# + 1 = 2, which is prime. Similarly, the first term of the first sequence is not 1 (hence the first term of the second sequence is also not 2), because p_{1}# = 2, and 2 − 1 = 1 is not prime.

The first few primorial primes are 2, 3, 5, 7, 29, 31, 211, 2309, 2311, 30029, 200560490131, 304250263527209, 23768741896345550770650537601358309 (sequence A228486 in the OEIS).

As of 2025, it is not known whether there are infinitely many primorial primes, and it is also not known whether infinitely many numbers of the form p_{n}# ± 1 are composite numbers.

As of July 2025, the largest known prime of the form p_{n}# − 1 is 6533299# − 1 (n = 446,895) with 2,835,864 digits, found by the PrimeGrid project.

As of July 2025, the largest known prime of the form p_{n}# + 1 is 9562633# + 1 (n = 637,491) with 4,151,498 digits, also found by the PrimeGrid project.

Euclid's proof of the infinitude of the prime numbers is commonly misinterpreted as defining the primorial primes, in the following manner:

Assume that the first n consecutive primes including 2 are the only primes that exist. If either p_{n}# + 1 or p_{n}# − 1 is a primorial prime, it means that there are larger primes than the nth prime (if neither is a prime, that also proves the infinitude of primes, but less directly; each of these two numbers has a remainder of either p − 1 or 1 when divided by any of the first n primes, and hence all its prime factors are larger than p_{n}).

== See also ==
- Compositorial
- Euclid number
- Factorial prime

== See also ==
- A. Borning, "Some Results for $k! + 1$ and $2 \cdot 3 \cdot 5 \cdot p + 1$" Math. Comput. 26 (1972): 567–570.
- Chris Caldwell, The Top Twenty: Primorial at The Prime Pages.
- Harvey Dubner, "Factorial and Primorial Primes." J. Rec. Math. 19 (1987): 197–203.
- Paulo Ribenboim, The New Book of Prime Number Records. New York: Springer-Verlag (1989): 4.
