= Lehmer =

Lehmer is a surname. Notable people with the surname include:

- Derrick Norman Lehmer (1867–1938), number theorist who produced tables of prime factors and mechanical devices like Lehmer sieves
- Derrick Henry Lehmer (1905–1991), number theorist known for Lucas–Lehmer test, son of D. N. Lehmer and husband of Emma Lehmer
- Emma Lehmer (1906–2007), Russian mathematician, known for her work on reciprocity laws, wife of D. H. Lehmer
- Kat Lehmer, American film director, writer, actor and artist

== See also ==
- Derrick Lehmer (disambiguation)
- Lehmer–Schur algorithm, in mathematics, named after Derrick Henry Lehmer
- Lehmer code
- Lehmer's conjecture (also known as: the Lehmer's Mahler measure problem), a problem in number theory, after Derrick Henry Lehmer
- Lehmer five, named after Dick Lehmer
- Lehmer's GCD algorithm, named after Derrick Henry Lehmer, a rather fast GCD algorithm
- Lehmer matrix, in mathematics, named after Derrick Henry Lehmer
- Lehmer mean, named after Derrick Henry Lehmer
- Lehmer number, in mathematics
- Lehmer's polynomial, named after Derrick Henry Lehmer
- Lucas–Lehmer primality test, in mathematics, after Derrick Henry Lehmer
- Lehmer random number generator, named after D. H. Lehmer
- Lehmer sieve
- Lucas–Lehmer test
- Lucas–Lehmer–Riesel test, in mathematics

== See also ==
- Lemer (disambiguation)
- Lemmer (surname)
