= Derrick Lehmer =

Derrick Lehmer may refer to:

- D. H. Lehmer (Derrick Henry Lehmer, 1905–1991), American mathematician and number theorist
- Derrick Norman Lehmer (1867–1938), American mathematician and number theorist
