= Luigi Poletti =

Luigi Poletti may refer to:

- Luigi Poletti (architect) (1792–1869), Italian neoclassical architect
- Luigi Poletti (mathematician) (1864–1967), Italian mathematician and poet
