= Lemmer (surname) =

Lemmer is a German language surname. In Belgium, the name was first recorded in Antwerp, and some members of the Lemmer family became powerful and elevated to the ranks of nobility. The name may have originated with whalers in the town of Lemmer, Friesland (Netherlands). The name may refer to:

- Anton Lemmer (1871–1957), New Zealand musician
- August Lemmer (1862–1952), German artist
- Ernst Lemmer (1898–1970), German politician
- Ivan Lemmer (born 1931), South African general
- Ludwig Lemmer (1891–1983), German architect
- Mark Lemmer (born 1967), British race car driver
- Shulem Lemmer (born 1990), American singer
- Yaakov Lemmer (born 1983), American singer
- Tricia Lemmer (born 1949), Author, Astrologer

== See also ==
- Lemer (disambiguation)
- Lemmer (disambiguation)
