= Kaiser-Friedrich-Gedächtniskirche =

Protestant church in Berlin, Germany

Coordinates: 52°30′54″N 13°20′36″E

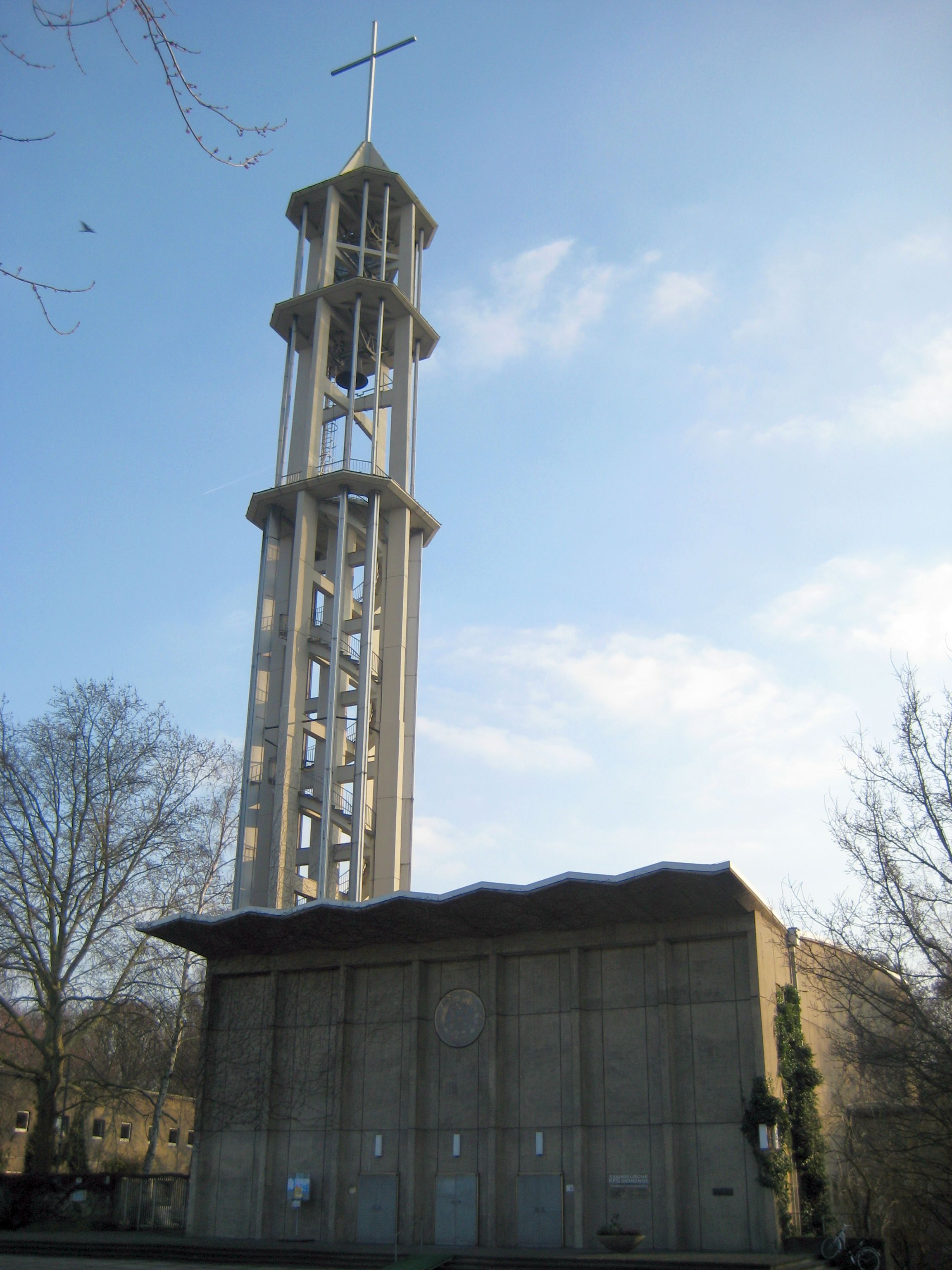
The Kaiser-Friedrich-Gedächtniskirche

The Kaiser-Friedrich-Gedächtniskirche (English: Emperor Frederick Memorial Church) is a German Protestant church owned and used by a congregation within the Evangelical Church of Berlin-Brandenburg-Silesian Upper Lusatia. The church building is situated in Händelallee in Hansaviertel (a locality of Berlin's Mitte borough) near Großer Tiergarten. Designed by architect Ludwig Lemmer, it was built in 1957, replacing a former nineteenth-century building designed by Johannes Vollmer which was destroyed during World War II.
