= Luigi Poletti (mathematician) =

Italian mathematician and poet (1864–1967)

Luigi Poletti (31 December 1864 – 10 March 1967) was an Italian mathematician and poet. He was born in Pontremoli, where he also died, at the age of 102.

He attended the episcopal seminary in Potremoli, then the high school of Parma, graduated in Turin and started to study mathematics there. He did not finish and took a job in a bank. In 1911, he accidentally found the book of prime number tables written by Lehmer, a mathematician from the United States, in the house of professor Gino Loria, a friend of his family, when he visited Genoa. Since then, he spent many years extending the first table in order to simplify "Eratosthenes Crivello" (sieve of Eratosthenes), a method from ancient Greece to find prime numbers. He gave his method a new name: "Neocribrum" (Novum Eratosthenes Cribrum), and he got recognition from the scientific community. Apart from that, he was, together with André Gerardin, a member of a study commission of the Association française pour l'avancement des sciences (1946). With the assistance of N. G. W. H. Beeger he had the possibility to extend the table of Lehmer beyond the number 10 006 721. In 1955, he was awarded a gold medal and the order of the Republic of Italy by Italian president Giovanni Gronchi.

In his long life (102 years), he was a member of the city council in the rank of Commissario Prefettizio. He was a poet in his native dialect Pontremolese (poems and texts for popular music). He wrote, for example, Al Campanon d‘ Pontrémal, La Zumniana (for which he also composed the music) or Al cant dal Cont Ugolìn. He translated XXXIII of "Dante's Inferno". As an amateur, he wrote poems in Latin.
