= Lehmer's totient problem =

Unsolved problem in mathematics

Unsolved problem in mathematics
Can the totient function of a composite number $n$ divide $n-1$?
More unsolved problems in mathematics

In mathematics, Lehmer's totient problem asks whether there is any composite number n such that Euler's totient function φ(n) divides n − 1. This is an unsolved problem.

It is known that φ(n) = n − 1 if and only if n is prime. So for every prime number n, we have φ(n) = n − 1 and thus in particular φ(n) divides n − 1. D. H. Lehmer asked in 1932 whether there exist composite numbers with this property.

== History ==
- Lehmer showed that if any composite solution n exists, it must be odd, square-free, and divisible by at least seven distinct primes (i.e. ω(n) ≥ 7). Such a number must also be a Carmichael number.
- In 1980, Cohen and Hagis proved that, for any solution n to the problem, ω(n) ≥ 14.
- In 1988, Hagis showed that if 3 divides any solution n, then n > 10^{1937042} and ω(n) ≥ 298848. This was subsequently improved by Burcsi, Czirbusz, and Farkas, who showed that if 3 divides any solution n, then n > 10^{360000000} and ω(n) ≥ 40000000.
- A 2011 result of Luca and Pomerance states that the number of solutions to the problem less than X is at most X^{1/2} / (log X)^{1/2 + o(1)}.
- In 2019 Burek and Żmija proved that any solution n satisfies n < 2^{2^{ω(n)}} - 2^{2^{ω(n)-1}}.
