= Asilomar International Conference on Climate Intervention Technologies =

2010 American climate change conference

The Asilomar International Conference on Climate Intervention Technologies was a conference developed by Margaret Leinen of the Climate Response Fund and chaired by Michael MacCracken of the Climate Institute. The conference took place in March 2010 and the recommendations were published in November 2010. The goal was to identify and minimize the risks involved with climate engineering (geoengineering, or climate intervention), and was based on the 1975 Asilomar Conference on Recombinant DNA which discussed the potential biohazards and regulation of biotechnology. A group of over 150 scientist and engineers gathered together with lawyers, environmentalists and disaster relief workers in an open meeting to avoid accusations of conspiracy during this discussion. The Asilomar Conference focused exclusively on the development of risk reduction guidelines for climate intervention experiments.

== Goals of the conference ==
- Identify potential risks associated with climate intervention experiments
- Propose a system to assess experiment design for potential categorical risks and suggest precautions to assure their safe conduct
- Propose voluntary standards for climate intervention research for the international scientific community

== Recommendations ==
- The core rationale for pursuit of climate engineering research is to advance the collective well-being of society and the environment;
- Climate engineering research is internationally planned and coordinated;
- Appropriately scoped governmental oversight, public involvement, and decision-making takes place during consideration and conduct of planned activities;
- Transparency and exchange of research plans, data, and findings minimize the need for environmentally disruptive experiments and maximize the learning from experiments that are conducted; and
- Regular, independent evaluation and assessment of the extent of understanding and uncertainty is carried out to provide optimal information and confidence for the public and policymakers

== Steering committee ==
- Michael C. MacCracken (chair), Climate Institute, USA
- Scott Barren, Columbia University, USA
- Roger Barry, World Data Center for Glaciology and University of Colorado, USA
- Paul Crutzen (corresponding member), Max Planck Institute, Germany, and Scripps Institution of Oceanography, USA
- Steven Hamburg, Chief Scientist, Environmental Defense Fund, USA
- Richard Lampitt, National Oceanography Centre and University of Southampton, UK
- Diana Liverman, University of Arizona, US, and Oxford University, UK
- Thomas Lovejoy, H. John Heinz III Center for Science, Economics and the Environment, USA
- Gordon McBean, The University of Western Ontario, Canada
- John Shepherd, National Oceanography Centre, University of Southampton, and Tyndall Centre for Climate Change Research, UK
- Stephen Seidel, Pew Center on Global Climate Change, USA
- Richard Somerville, Scripps Institution of Oceanography, University of California, San Diego, USA
- Tom M. L. Wigley, University of Adelaide, Australia
