= N. G. W. H. Beeger =

Dutch mathematician

Nicolaas George Wijnand Henri Beeger (1884, in Utrecht – 1965, in Amsterdam) was a Dutch mathematician. His 1916 doctorate was on Dirichlet series. He worked for most of his life as a teacher, working on mathematics papers in his spare evenings. After his retirement as a teacher at 65, he began corresponding with many contemporary mathematicians and dedicated himself to his work.

He is known for having proved that 3511 is a Wieferich prime in 1922 and for introducing the term Carmichael number in 1950.

== Beeger Lecture ==
In 1989 the board of trustees of the Mathematical Centre in Amsterdam established the Beeger lectures, in honor of N.G.W.H. Beeger, to be held biannually at the congress of the Royal Dutch Mathematical Society. Their purpose is to promote research and exchange of ideas in the field of algorithmic and computational number theory. The first Beeger Lecture was delivered in 1992.

- 2024 Andrew Sutherland
- 2022 Shafi Goldwasser
- 2021 David Harvey
- 2018 Fernando Rodriguez Villegas
- 2016 James Maynard
- 2014 Daniele Micciancio
- 2012 Yuri Bilu
- 2010 Florian Luca
- 2008 Daniel Bernstein
- 2006 Manindra Agrawal
- 2004 Manjul Bhargava
- 2002 Bjorn Poonen
- 2000 Peter Borwein
- 1998 Hendrik Lenstra
- 1996 John Conway
- 1994 Hugh Williams
- 1992 Carl Pomerance

== Works ==
- (in French) (N. G. W. H. Beeger ed.), Jakob Philipp Kulik, Luigi Poletti, R. J. Porter, Liste des nombres premiers du onzième million: (plus précisément de 10.006.741 à 10.999.997), Association française pour l'avancement des sciences, Ed. "Werto", 1951
