= West Coast Number Theory =

Annual gathering for mathematics in western North America

West Coast Number Theory (conference)
- Status: Active
- Genre: Mathematics conference
- Frequency: Annual
- Country: U.S.
- Years active: 1969–present
- Inaugurated: 1969; 57 years ago
- Founder: Derrick H. Lehmer and Emma Lehmer
- Previous event: 2021
- Next event: December 2025
- Major events: Active
- Website: westcoastnumbertheory.org

West Coast Number Theory (WCNT), a meeting that has also been known variously as the Western Number Theory Conference and the Asilomar Number Theory meeting, is an annual gathering of number theorists first organized by D. H. and Emma Lehmer at the Asilomar Conference Grounds in 1969. In his tribute to D. H. Lehmer, John Brillhart stated that "There is little doubt that one of [Dick and Emma's] most enduring contributions to the world of mathematicians is their founding of the West Coast Number Theory Meeting [an annual event] in 1969". To date, the conference remains an active meeting of young and experienced number theorists alike.

== History ==
West Coast Number Theory has been held at a variety of locations throughout western North America. Typically, odd years are held in Pacific Grove, California. Until 2013, this was always at the Asilomar Conference Grounds, though meetings from 2014 to 2017 moved to the Lighthouse Lodge, just up the road.

- 1969 Asilomar
- 1970 Tucson
- 1971 Asilomar
- 1972 Claremont
- 1973 Los Angeles
- 1974 Los Angeles
- 1975 Asilomar
- 1976 San Diego
- 1977 Los Angeles
- 1978 Santa Barbara
- 1979 Asilomar
- 1980 Tucson
- 1981 Santa Barbara
- 1982 San Diego
- 1983 Asilomar
- 1984 Asilomar
- 1985 Asilomar
- 1986 Tucson
- 1987 Asilomar
- 1988 Las Vegas
- 1989 Asilomar
- 1990 Asilomar
- 1991 Asilomar
- 1992 Corvallis
- 1993 Asilomar
- 1994 San Diego
- 1995 Asilomar
- 1996 Las Vegas
- 1997 Asilomar
- 1998 San Francisco
- 1999 Asilomar
- 2000 San Diego
- 2001 Asilomar
- 2002 San Francisco
- 2003 Asilomar
- 2004 Las Vegas
- 2005 Asilomar
- 2006 Ensenada
- 2007 Asilomar
- 2008 Fort Collins
- 2009 Asilomar
- 2010 Orem
- 2011 Asilomar
- 2012 Asilomar
- 2013 Asilomar
- 2014 Pacific Grove
- 2015 Pacific Grove
- 2016 Pacific Grove
- 2017 Pacific Grove
- 2018 Chico
- 2019 Asilomar (50th Anniversary Conference)
- 2020 Canceled
- 2021 Virtual
- 2022 Asilomar
- 2023 Henderson
- 2024 Asilomar
- 2025 Asilomar

== Related ==
- Asilomar Conference Grounds
- Pacific Grove, California
