= Lemmer (disambiguation) =

Lemmer is a town in the Netherlands.

Lemmer may also refer to:

- Lemmer (surname), including a list of people with the name
- Lemmer (whaling), a person who dismembers (butchers) a whale

== See also ==
- Lemmeria, a moth genus
