= Michael MacCracken =

American meteorologist (born 1942)

Michael Calvin MacCracken (born 1942), has been chief scientist for climate change programs with the Climate Institute in Washington, D.C., since 2002; he was also elected to its board of directors in 2006.

== Early life ==
Born in Schenectady, New York, he graduated from Tenafly High School in 1960 before receiving his B.S. in engineering from Princeton University in 1964 and his Ph.D. in applied science from the University of California Davis in 1968. His dissertation involved development and application of an early global climate model to analyze the plausibility of then current hypotheses for the causes of ice age cycling.

== Academic research ==
From 1968 to 1993, MacCracken’s research at the Lawrence Livermore National Laboratory focused on development and application of numerical models to the study of climate change (including study of the potential climatic effects of greenhouse gases, volcanic aerosols, land-cover change, nuclear war, and factors affecting air quality (including photochemical pollution) in the San Francisco Bay Area.

== Positions held ==
Project director (1976–1979) of the United States Department of Energy’s Multistate Atmospheric Power Production Pollution Study, which focused on acid precipitation in the northeastern US, and was a program adviser (1979–93) for various components of DOE’s Carbon Dioxide Research Program, including serving as lead editor of two volumes of DOE’s 1985 assessments on climate change. From 1984 to 1990, he served as U.S. co-chair of Project 02.08–11 under Working Group VIII of the US/USSR Joint Committee on Cooperation in the Field of Environmental Protection. At LLNL, he served as deputy division leader for atmospheric and geophysical sciences from 1974 to 1987 and division leader from 1974 to 1987.

From 1993 to 2002, MacCracken was on assignment from LLNL to the interagency Office of the U.S. Global Change Research Program (USGCRP) in Washington D.C., as senior global change scientist. With the Office, he served as its first executive director from 1993 to 1997 and as executive director of the National Assessment Coordination Office from 1997 to 2001, coordinating preparation of the first comprehensive national assessment of climate change impacts on the US [16,17]. During this assignment, MacCracken also served as a co-author/contributing author for various chapters in the assessment reports of the Intergovernmental Panel on Climate Change (IPCC), as well as coordinating preparation of the official U.S. Government reviews of the Second and Third IPCC Assessment Reports. He also served as president of the International Commission on Climate from 1995 to 2003 and co-editor of volume 1 of the Encyclopedia of Global Environmental Change.

From 2003 to 2007, MacCracken served as president of the International Association of Meteorology and Atmospheric Sciences (IAMAS) and on the executive committees of International Union of Geodesy and Geophysics (IUGG), members of which are the national academies of science or their equivalent in about 65 nations. He also was a member of the executive committee of the Scientific Committee for Oceanic Research (SCOR) from 2003 to 2011 and a member of the synthesis team for the Arctic Climate Impact Assessment from 2002 to 2004 [20]. From 2004 to 202007 he served on a scientific expert group convened by Sigma Xi and the UN Foundation at the request of the UN Commission on Sustainable Development to suggest the best measures for mitigating and adapting to global climate change.

MacCracken’s current research interests include climate engineering and the especially important role in limiting climate change that can be played by reduction in emissions of short-lived greenhouse gases and absorbing aerosols. He has also prepared several declarations relating to climate change, one of which was cited favorably by Justice Stevens in his majority opinion in the April 2007 decision by the US Supreme Court in the case of Massachusetts et al. versus the United States Environmental Protection Agency (EPA).

MacCracken is a fellow of the American Association for the Advancement of Science (AAAS), and a member of the American Meteorological Society, American Geophysical Union, the Oceanography Society, and Sigma Xi. He was a publicly elected member of the board of directors of the Livermore (California) Area Recreation and Park District (LARPD) from 1970 to 1978. He also edited the book about Josiah Calvin McCracken, his maternal grandfather. He is the great-grandson of Henry Mitchell MacCracken, grandson of Henry Noble MacCracken, son of Calvin Dodd MacCracken, and brother of Mark MacCracken.

Since 2013, MacCracken has been listed on the Advisory Council of the National Center for Science Education.

== Bibliography ==
- 1. ^Bio profile, Climate Institute. Accessed August 9, 2011
- 2. “MacCracken, M. C., 1968: Ice Age Theory Analysis by Computer Model Simulation
- 3. MacCracken, M. C., 1982: Climate change talk at Sandia National Laboratory (in 6 parts), Albuquerque NM.
- 4. MacCracken, M. C., and J. S. Chang, 1975: A preliminary study of the potential chemical and climatic effects of atmospheric nuclear explosions. Lawrence Livermore National Laboratory Report UCRL-51653. [Note: I now have a pdf of this and am hopeful LLNL will soon have this online]
- 5. Pittock, A. B., T. Ackerman, P. Crutzen, M. MacCracken, C. Shapiro, and R. Turco, 1986: The Environmental Consequences of Nuclear War: Volume 1. Physical and Atmospheric Effects, SCOPE Volume 28, John Wiley and Sons, Chichester, 359 pp.
- 6. MacCracken, M. C., D. Wuebbles, J. Walton, W. Duewer, and K. Grant, 1978: The Livermore regional air quality model: I. Concept and development. J. Appl. Meteorol., 17, 254–272.
- 7. Duewer, W., M. C. MacCracken, and J. Walton, 1978: The Livermore regional air quality model: II. Verification and sample application in the San Francisco Bay Area. J. Appl. Meteorol., 17, 273–311.
- 8. MacCracken, M. C., 1979: The Multistate Atmospheric Power Production Pollution Study—MAP3S: Progress Report for FY-1977 and FY-1978, US Department of Energy Report DOE/EV-0040, July. Also MacCracken, M. C., 1978: MAP3S: An investigation of atmospheric, energy related pollutants in the northeastern United States. Atmos. Environ., 12, 649–659.
- 9. MacCracken, M. C. (chairman), E. Aronson, D. Barns, S. Barr, C. Bloyd, D. Bruns, R. Cushman, R. Darwin, D. DeAngelis, M. Edenburn, J. Edmonds, W. Emanuel, D. Engi, M. Farrell, J. Hales, E. Hillsman, C. Hunsaker, A. King, A. Liebetrau, B. Manowitz, G. Marland, S. McDonald, J. Penner, S. Rayner, N. Rosenberg, M. Scott, M. Steinberg, W. Westman, D. Wuebbles, and G. Yohe, 1990: Energy and Climate Change. Report of the DOE Multi-Laboratory Climate Change Committee. Lewis Publishers, Boca Raton, FL, 161 pp.
- 10. MacCracken, M. C., and F. M. Luther (Eds.), 1985: Projecting the Climatic Effects of Increasing Carbon Dioxide, DOE/ER-0237, US Department of Energy, Washington, DC, 381 pp.
- 11. MacCracken, M. C., and F. M. Luther (Eds.), 1985: Detecting the Climatic Effects of Increasing Carbon Dioxide. DOE/ER-0235, US Department of Energy, Washington, DC, 198 pp.
- 12. MacCracken, M. C., M. I. Budyko, A. D. Hecht, and Y. A. Izrael (Eds.), 1990: Prospects for Future Climate: A Special US/USSR Report on Climate and Climate Change. Lewis Publishers, Boca Raton, FL, 270 pp.
- 13. MacCracken, M. C., and J. R. Albritton (eds.), 1992: Atmospheric and Geophysical Sciences Program Report 1990–1991, Lawrence Livermore National Laboratory report UCRL-51444-90-91, Livermore CA, 163 pp.
- 14. Our Changing Climate: The FY-1996 U. S. Global Change Research Program, report of the Subcommittee on Global Change Research, Committee on Environment and Natural Resources Research of the National Science and Technology Council, Washington DC, 152 pp.
- 15. Our Changing Climate: The FY-1997 U. S. Global Change Research Program, report of the Subcommittee on Global Change Research, Committee on Environment and Natural Resources of the National Science and Technology Council, Washington DC, 162 pp.
- 16. National Assessment Synthesis Team, 2000: Climate Change Impacts on the United States: The Potential Consequences of Climate Variability and Change: Overview Report, U. S. Global Change Research Program, Cambridge University Press, Cambridge UK, 154 pp.
- 17. National Assessment Synthesis Team, 2001: Climate Change Impacts on the United States: The Potential Consequences of Climate Variability and Change: Foundation Report, U. S. Global Change Research Program, Cambridge University Press, Cambridge UK, 612 pp.
- 18. MacCracken, M. C., and J. S. Perry (editors), 2002: Encyclopedia of Global and Environmental Change, Volume 1: The Earth System: Physical and Chemical Dimensions of Global Environmental Change, one of five volumes under chief editor T. Munn, John Wiley and Sons, London, 773 pp.
- 19. Michael MacCracken, Past-President IAMAS (2007–2011), International Association of Meteorology and Atmospheric Sciences. Accessed August 9, 2011
- 20. Arctic Climate Impact Assessment (ACIA), 2004: Impacts of a Warming Arctic: Arctic Climate Impact Assessment, Cambridge University Press, 140 pp. [link to https://web.archive.org/web/20170924094921/http://www.acia.uaf.edu/]
- 21. Scientific Expert Group on Climate Change (SEG), 2007: Confronting Climate Change: Avoiding the Unmanageable and Managing the Unavoidable, Rosina M. Bierbaum, John P. Holdren, Michael C. MacCracken, Richard H. Moss, and Peter H. Raven (eds.), Report prepared for the United Nations Commission on Sustainable Development by Sigma Xi, Research Triangle Park, NC, and the United Nations Foundation, Washington, DC, 144 pp.
- 22. MacCracken, M. C., 2009: Beyond Mitigation: Potential Options for Counter-Balancing the Climatic and Environmental Consequences of the Rising Concentrations of Greenhouse Gases, Background Paper to the 2010 World Development Report, Policy Research Working Paper (RWP) 4938, The World Bank, Washington, DC, May 2009, 43 pp.
- 23. Asilomar Scientific Organizing Committee [M. MacCracken (chair), S. Barrett, R. Barry, P. Crutzen, S. Hamburg, R. Lampitt, D. Liverman, T. Lovejoy, G. McBean, E. Parson, S. Seidel, J. Shepherd, R. Somerville, and T. M. L. Wigley], 2010: The Asilomar Conference Recommendations on Principles for Research into Climate Engineering Technologies: Conference Report, Climate Institute, Washington DC, 37 pp.
- 24. A Search for Rules Before Climate-Changing Experiments Begin, New York Times, January 18, 2010
- 25. MacCracken, M. C., 2008: Prospects for Future Climate Change and the Reasons for Early Action, Journal of the Air and Waste Management Association, 58, 735–786.
- 26. Moore, F. C., and M. C. MacCracken, 2009: Lifetime-leveraging: An approach to achieving international agreement and effective climate protection using mitigation of short-lived greenhouse gases, International Journal of Climate Change Strategies and Management 1, 42–62.
- 27. Link to: https://www.law.cornell.edu/supct/html/05-1120.ZO.html
- 2.28. ^ 2007 SUMMER POLICY COLLOQUIUM, Speaker Biographies, American Meteorological Society. Accessed August 9, 2011
- 3.29. Helen McCracken Fulcher, edited by Michael MacCracken, 1995: Mission to Shanghai: The Life of Medical Service of Josiah C. McCracken, Tiffin Press, New London NH, 275 pp.
