= Lehmer matrix =

In mathematics, particularly matrix theory, the n×n Lehmer matrix (named after Derrick Henry Lehmer) is the constant symmetric matrix defined by

$$A_{ij} =
\begin{cases}
i/j, & j\ge i \\
j/i, & j<i.
\end{cases}$$

Alternatively, this may be written as

$$A_{ij} = \frac{\mbox{min}(i,j)}{\mbox{max}(i,j)}.$$

== Properties ==
As can be seen in the examples section, if A is an n×n Lehmer matrix and B is an m×m Lehmer matrix, then A is a submatrix of B whenever m>n. The values of elements diminish toward zero away from the diagonal, where all elements have value 1.

The inverse of a Lehmer matrix is a tridiagonal matrix, where the superdiagonal and subdiagonal have strictly negative entries. Consider again the n×n A and m×m B Lehmer matrices, where m>n. A rather peculiar property of their inverses is that A^{−1} is nearly a submatrix of B^{−1}, except for the A^{−1}_{n,n} element, which is not equal to B^{−1}_{n,n}.

A Lehmer matrix of order n has trace n.

== Examples ==
The 2×2, 3×3 and 4×4 Lehmer matrices and their inverses are shown below.

$$\begin{array}{lllll}
A_2=\begin{pmatrix}
1   & 1/2  \\
1/2 &   1
\end{pmatrix};
&
A_2^{-1}=\begin{pmatrix}
4/3 & -2/3  \\
-2/3 & {\color{Brown}{\mathbf{4/3}}}
\end{pmatrix};
\\
\\
A_3=\begin{pmatrix}
1   & 1/2 & 1/3 \\
1/2 &   1 & 2/3 \\
1/3 & 2/3 &   1
\end{pmatrix};
&
A_3^{-1}=\begin{pmatrix}
4/3 & -2/3  &      \\
-2/3 & 32/15 & -6/5 \\
& -6/5  & {\color{Brown}{\mathbf{9/5}}}
\end{pmatrix};
\\
\\
A_4=\begin{pmatrix}
1   & 1/2 & 1/3 & 1/4 \\
1/2 &   1 & 2/3 & 1/2 \\
1/3 & 2/3 &   1 & 3/4 \\
1/4 & 1/2 & 3/4 & 1
\end{pmatrix};
&
A_4^{-1}=\begin{pmatrix}
4/3 & -2/3  &        &       \\
-2/3 & 32/15 &  -6/5  &       \\
& -6/5  & 108/35 & -12/7 \\
&       & -12/7  & {\color{Brown}{\mathbf{16/7}}}
\end{pmatrix}.
\\
\end{array}$$

== See also ==
- Derrick Henry Lehmer
- Hilbert matrix
