= Kat Lehmer =

American film director (1958–2018)

Kat Lehmer (also known as Kathi Lehmer) was an American film director, writer, and actor. Born Dec. 21, 1958 — Died July 8, 2018

== Life and career ==
While attending the Pennsylvania Academy of the Fine Arts in Philadelphia where she studied painting, drawing, and sculpture, Lehmer was inspired by the works of an earlier alumnus, David Lynch, to pursue her interest in film making. A subsequent move to New York's Lower East Side exposed her to the underground film movement prevalent in the city during the 1980s where she lived across the street from ABC No Rio, a art and punk enclave where underground films were shown.

Lehmer started her film production company, Trinka Five Films in 2004. She wrote her first feature-length script for Mama and Damian in 2004, then produced, directed, and starred in the low-budget film production in 2007. Mama and Damian is a tale about a half-bear, half-human boy who begins to push the boundaries of his insular world. Lehmer plays the hybrid bear-boy's dominatrix mother. According to IMDb, Lehmer redesigned her own apartment to work as the main set for Mama and Damian. In an interview she said, "we couldn't move anything in my apartment for a year."

Lehmer studied editing at Immagine Studios in Wilmington, Delaware.

In 2009, Lehmer was reportedly in production in Philadelphia on her film Mortal, an existential vampire saga. She died in 2018 before completing final edits to the film.

== Filmography ==
=== Director ===
- Sunshine Arts (2011)
- Mortal (2010)
- Mama and Damian (2007)

=== Producer ===
- Internet Fear (2005)
