= Emma Lehmer =

American mathematician (1906–2007)

- Born: November 6, 1906; Samara, Russian Empire
- Died: May 7, 2007 (aged 100); Berkeley, California, U.S.
- Education: UC Berkeley; Brown University
- Occupation: Mathematician
- Spouse: Derrick Henry Lehmer
- Children: 2

Emma Markovna Lehmer (née Trotskaia; November 6, 1906 – May 7, 2007) was an American mathematician known for her work on reciprocity laws in algebraic number theory. She preferred to deal with complex number fields and integers, rather than the more abstract aspects of the theory.

== Biography ==
Lehmer was born in Samara, Russian Empire, but her father's job as a representative with a Russian sugar company moved the family to Harbin, China in 1910. Emma was tutored at home until the age of 14, when a school was opened locally. She managed to make her way to the US for her higher education.

At UC Berkeley, she started out in engineering in 1924, but found her niche in mathematics. One of her professors was Derrick N. Lehmer, the number theorist well known for his work on prime number tables and factorizations. While working for him at Berkeley finding pseudosquares, she met his son, her future husband Derrick H. Lehmer. Upon her graduation summa cum laude with a B.A. in Mathematics (1928), Emma married the younger Lehmer. They moved to Brown University, where Emma received her M.Sc., and Derrick his Ph.D., both in 1930. Emma did not obtain a Ph.D. herself; she claimed there were many advantages to not holding a doctorate.

The Lehmers had two children, Laura (1932) and Donald (1934).

== Contributions ==
Lehmer did independent mathematical work, including a translation from Russian to English of Pontryagin's book Topological Groups. She worked closely with her husband on many projects; 21 of her 56 publications were joint work with him. Her publications were mainly in number theory and computation, with emphasis on reciprocity laws, special primes, and congruences.

She proved that there were infinitely many Fibonacci pseudoprimes.

Paul Halmos, in his book I want to be a mathematician: An automathography, wrote about Lehmer's translation of Pontryagin's Topological Groups: "I read the English translation by Mrs. Lehmer (usually referred to as Emma Lemma)...". Several later publications repeated Halmos' reference to reinforce the significance of Lehmer's translation.

During World War II, she authored the paper "Simplified Rule for Determining Spacing in Train Bombing on Stationary Targets" and co-authored three others for the Statistical Laboratory at the University of California.

With her husband, she co-founded the West Coast Number Theory conference. Emma and Derrick Lehmer both have Erdős number two. They published a joint paper with John Brillhart in 1964 on bounds on consecutive power residues. Brillhart published a paper on the Rudin-Shapiro sequence with Erdős and Morton in 1983.
