= Lemmeria =

Scientific classification
- Domain: Eukaryota
- Kingdom: Animalia
- Phylum: Arthropoda
- Class: Insecta
- Order: Lepidoptera
- Superfamily: Noctuoidea
- Family: Noctuidae
- Genus: Lemmeria; Barnes & Benjamin, 1926
- Species: L. digitalis

Binomial name
- Lemmeria digitalis (Grote, 1882)

Genus of moths

Lemmeria is a monotypic moth genus of the family Noctuidae erected by William Barnes and Foster Hendrickson Benjamin in 1926. Its only species, Lemmeria digitalis, was first described by Augustus Radcliffe Grote in 1882. It is found in the US state of Maine.
