= Lemer =

Lemer may refer to:

- Peter Lemer (born 1942), English jazz musician
- Lemer, protagonist of 202 short story "A Hat for Lemer" by Cecil Browne

== See also ==
- Lemmer (disambiguation)
