= Asilomar Conference Grounds =

Conference center in California, U.S.

- U.S. National Register of Historic Places
- U.S. National Historic Landmark District
- California Historical Landmark
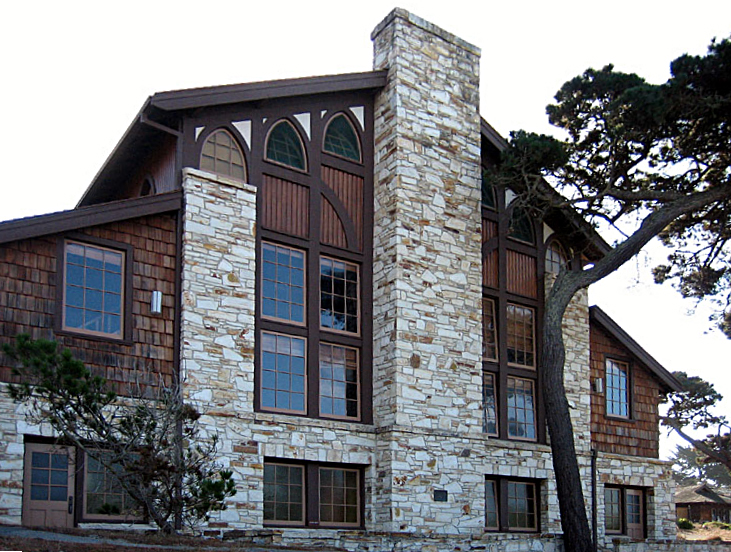
- Merrill Hall, Asilomar

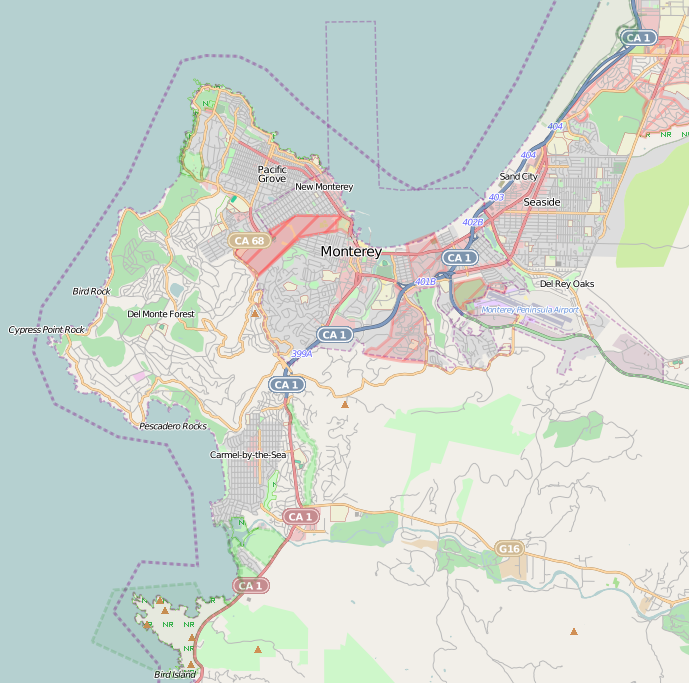
- Location within Monterey Peninsula Location within California
- Location: 800 Asilomar Blvd., Pacific Grove, California
- Coordinates: 36°37′08″N 121°56′16″W
- Area: 9 acres (3.6 ha)
- Built: 1913
- Architect: Julia Morgan
- Architectural style: Arts and Crafts Movement and American craftsman Bungalows
- NRHP reference No.: 87000823
- CHISL No.: 1052

Significant dates
- Added to NRHP: February 27, 1987
- Designated NHLD: February 27, 1987
- Designated CHISL: June 20, 2014

Asilomar Conference Grounds is a conference center originally built for the Young Women's Christian Association (YWCA). It is located on the western tip of the Monterey Peninsula in Pacific Grove, California, near what was formerly known as Moss Beach. Between 1913 and 1929, architect Julia Morgan designed 16 buildings on the property, 11 of which remain standing today. The area is recognized as the homeland of the Rumsen Ohlone people.

== Name ==
The conference facilities were originally known as "Guardamar". In 1913, Phoebe Hearst proposed a naming competition, resulting in the selection of "Asilomar." The winning entry was submitted by Helen Salisbury, a Stanford University student, who created a portmanteau from the Spanish words asilo ("refuge") and mar ("sea"). In 1956, Asilomar was incorporated into the California State Parks system, and Moss Beach was renamed Asilomar State Beach after the conference grounds.

== History ==
The YWCA Pacific Coast conferences were originally held at the Capitola, California hotel until 1911. Following growth in attendance and a desire to establish a permanent location, Phoebe Hearst hosted the 1912 conference at her hacienda in Pleasanton, California. Proceeds from that event were used to secure land for a permanent site. A committee persuaded the Pacific Improvement Company to donate 30 acres (120,000 m^{2}) to the YWCA in 1912. In early 1913, it was announced that Julia Morgan, then engaged with the Oakland YWCA building, would also design the new Asilomar campgrounds in the Arts & Crafts style. Construction began in the spring of 1913, and by August, the Social Hall and Longhouses were completed, hosting 300 girls for the inaugural summer program. Merrill Hall, Morgan’s final design for Asilomar, was dedicated in 1928.

Several other prominent California women including Ellen Browning Scripps, Mrs. Warren Olney Jr. and Mary Sroufe Merrill were involved in the creation of the retreat.

In 1956, the State of California acquired Asilomar and commissioned architect John Carl Warnecke to design seven additional buildings to expand the grounds. Asilomar was declared a National Historic Landmark in 1987 for its role in women's recreation, the development of the YWCA, and the resort heritage of nearby Monterey, California.

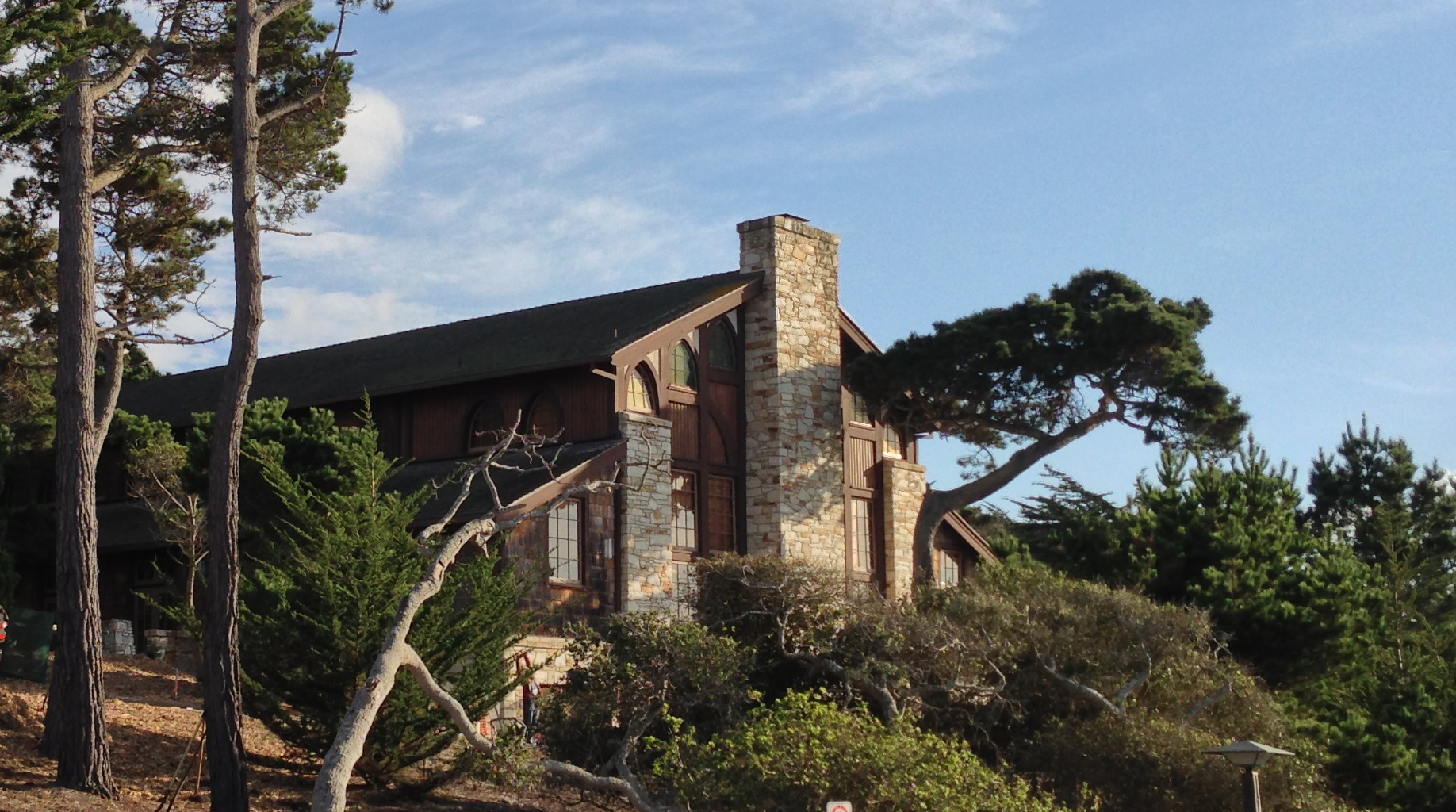

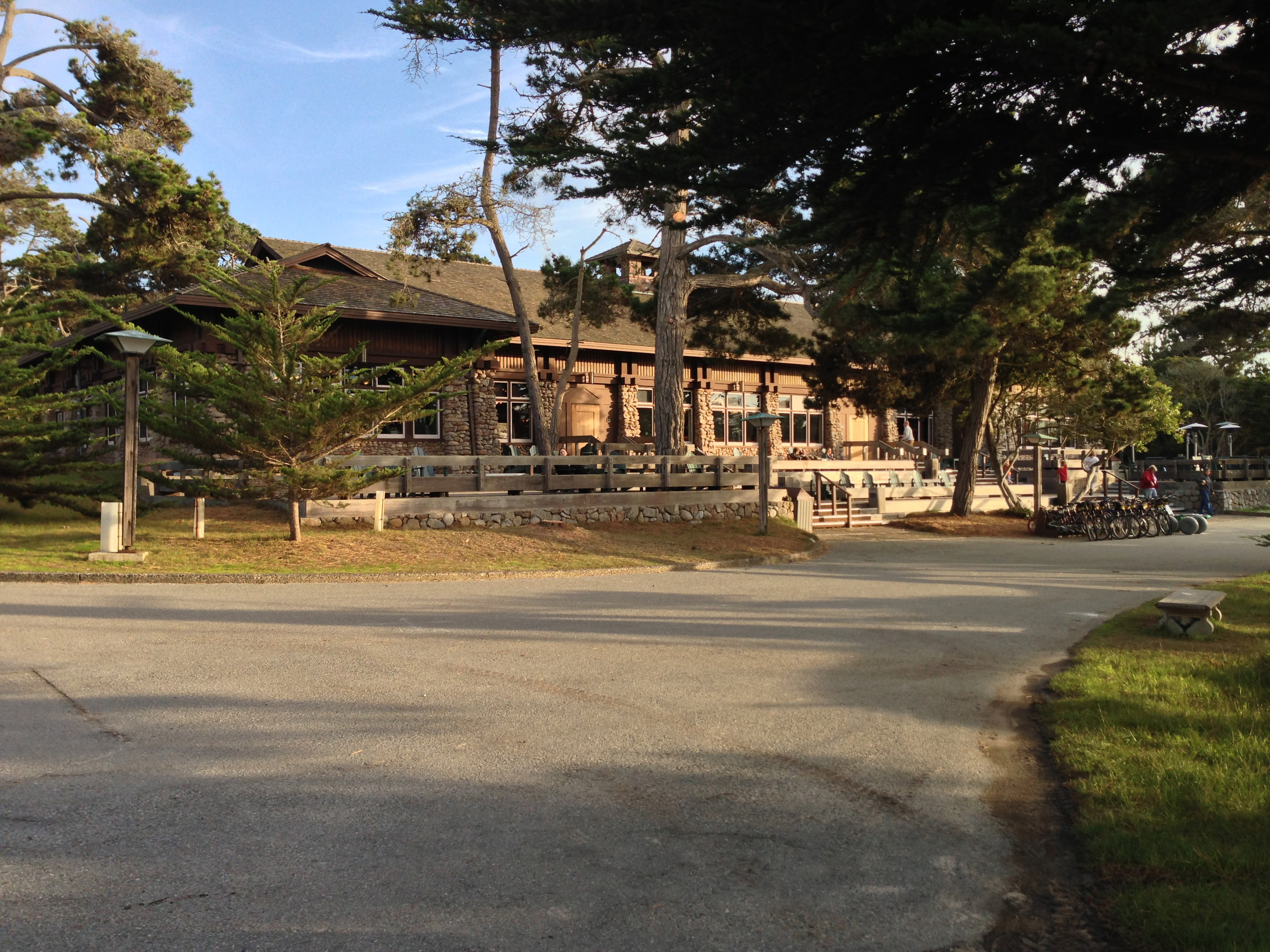

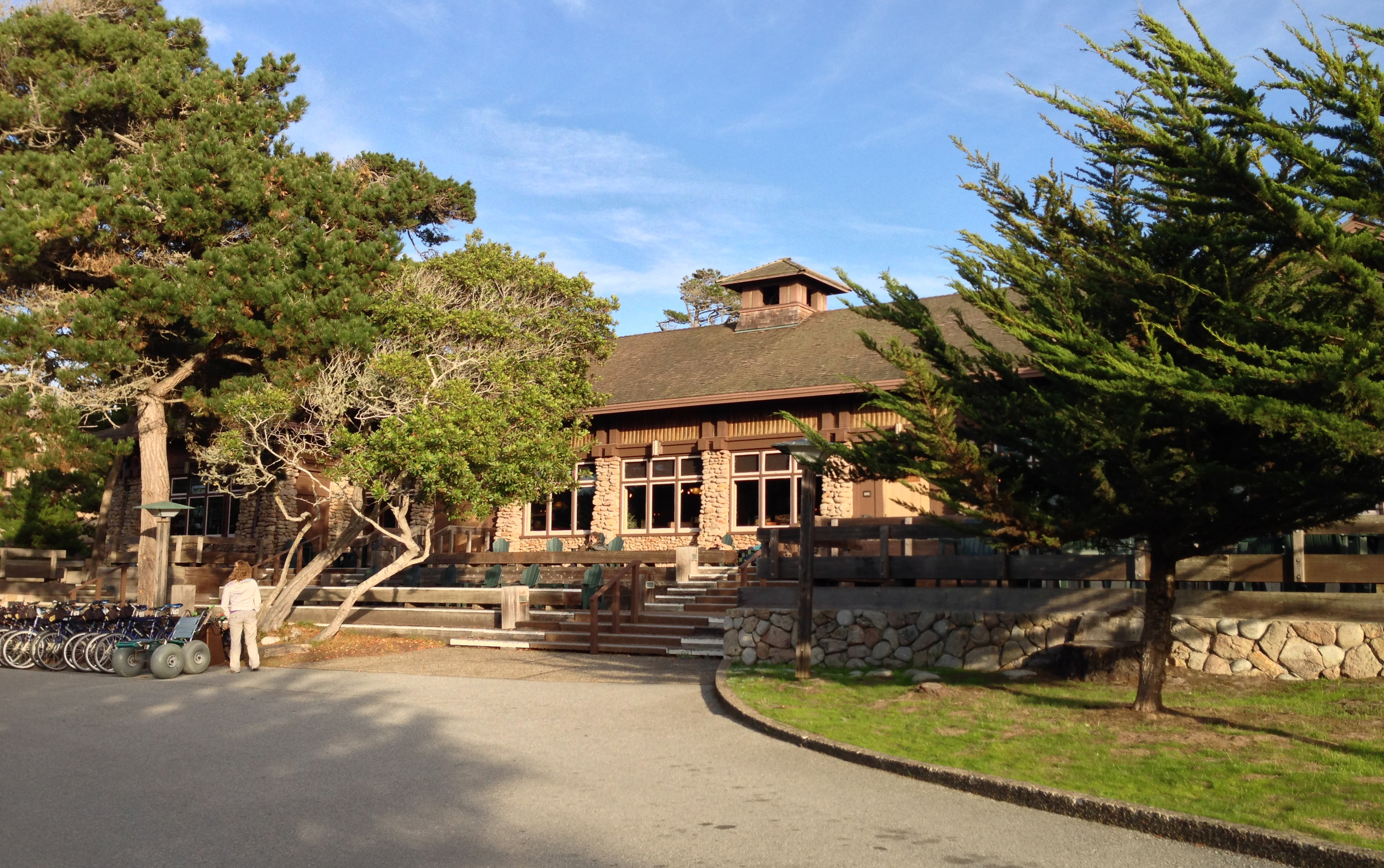

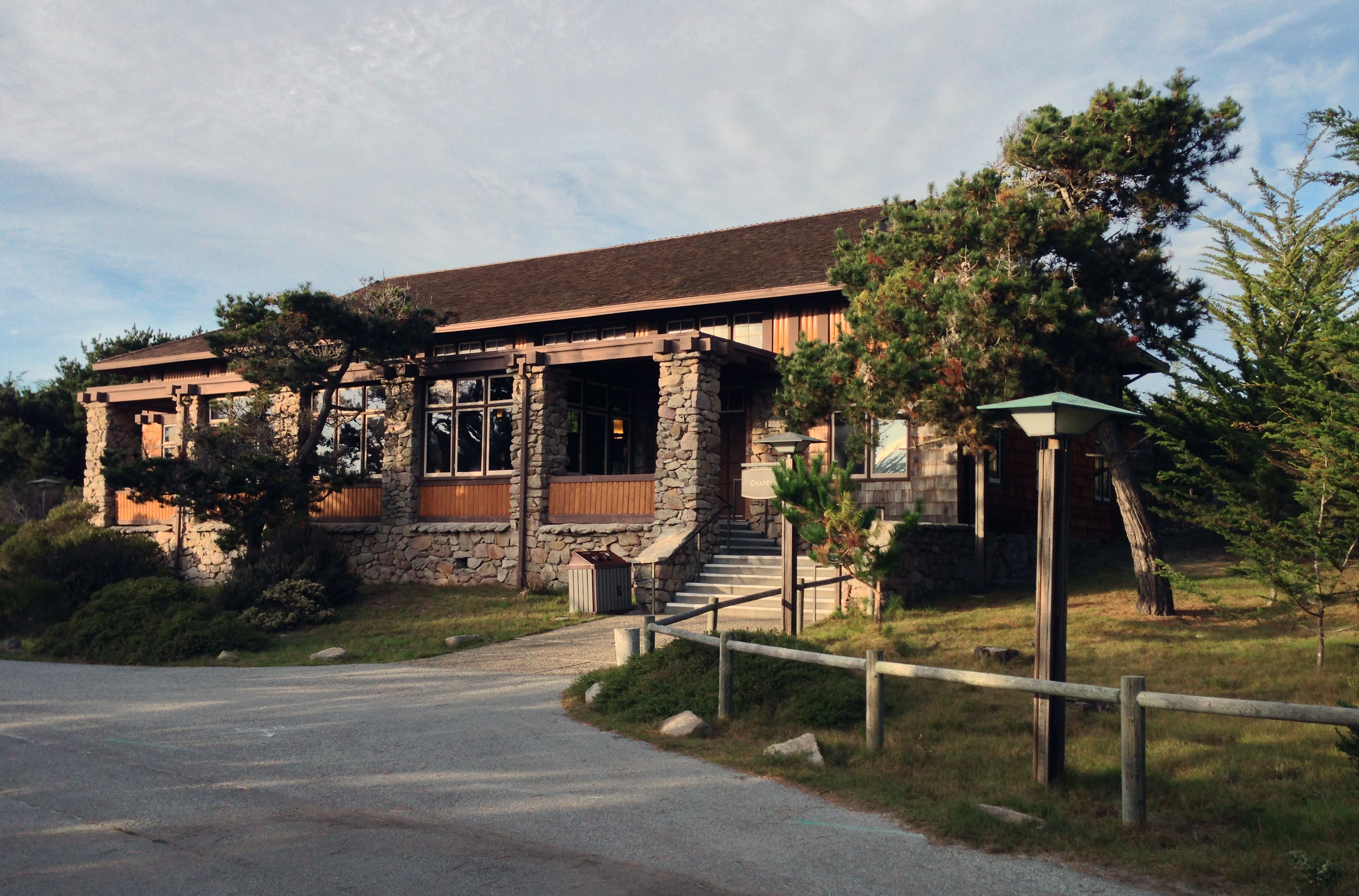

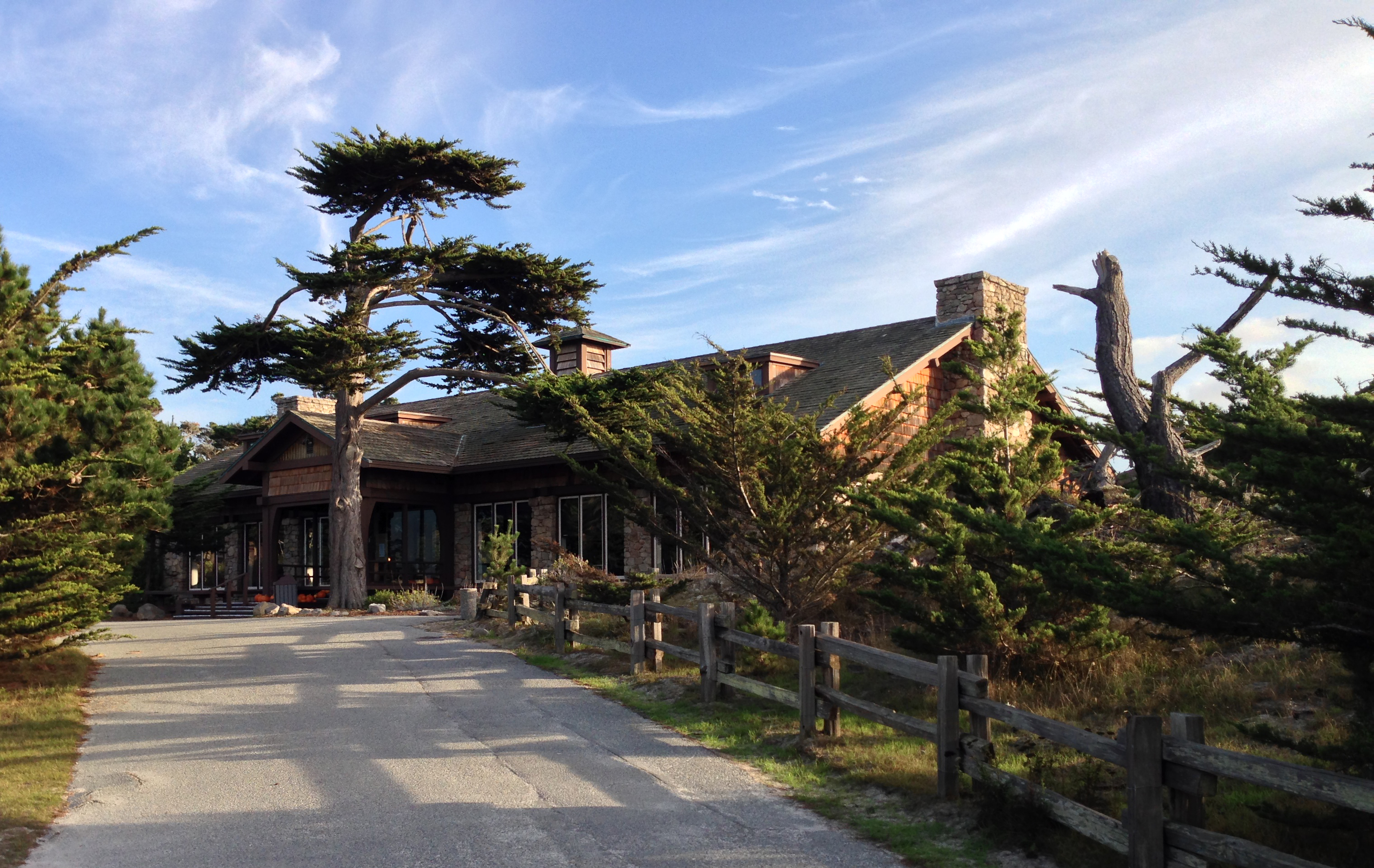

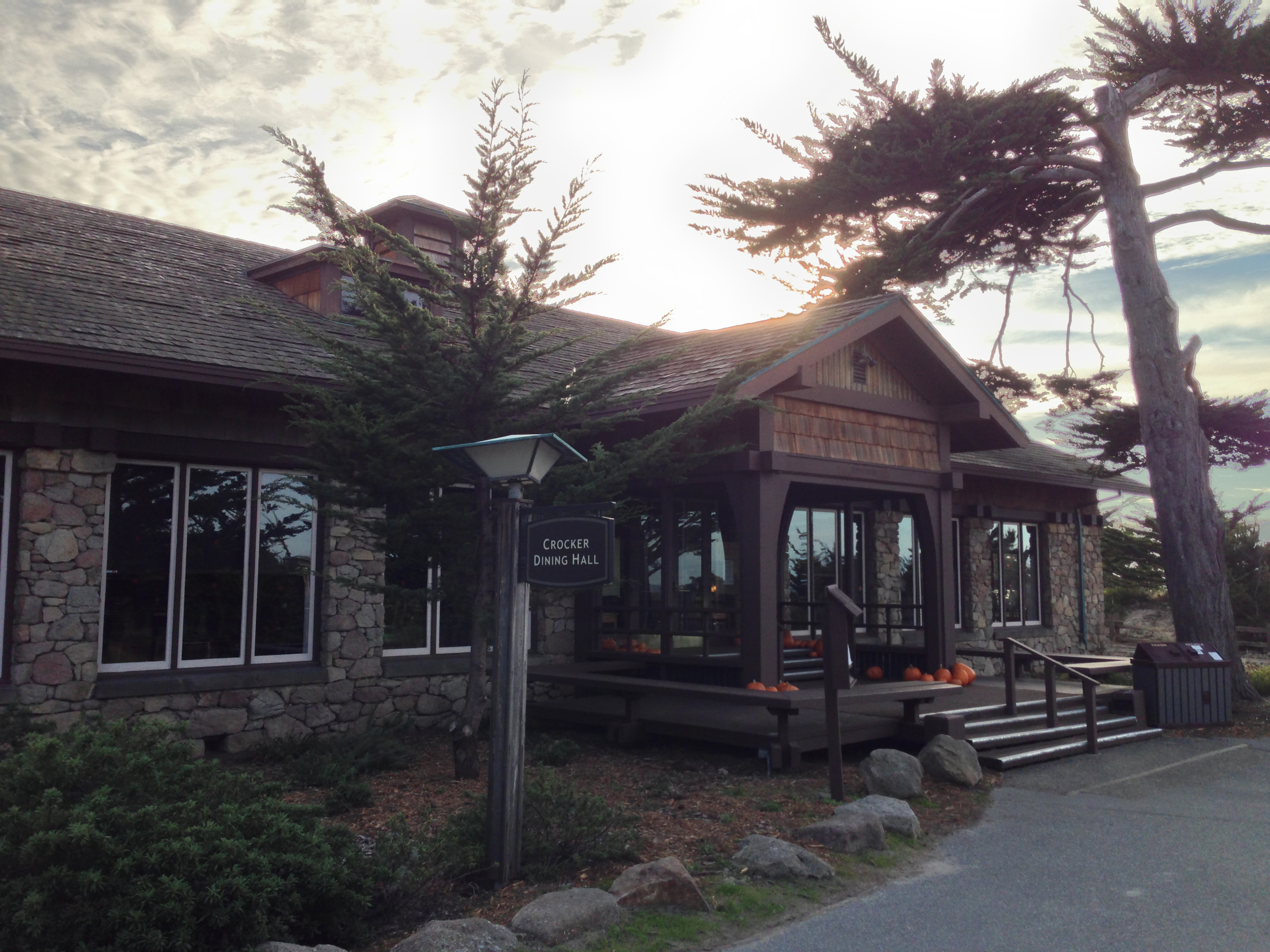

== Present Day ==
Today, the property is officially known as Asilomar State Beach and Conference Grounds and is operated by California State Parks. While it primarily functions as a conference center, it also welcomes individual guests and is frequently used for social events such as family reunions. The grounds remain open to the public. Between 1956 and 1994, the site was managed by various nonprofit organizations in collaboration with California State Parks. Delaware North Companies operated the facility from 1997 to 2007, after which Aramark took over operations in 2009 under a 20-year contract.

In 2012, construction began to improve the site's accessibility in compliance with the Americans with Disabilities Act. These renovations, which continued through 2014, included replacing old asphalt pathways with brick pavers and improving accessibility to several buildings.

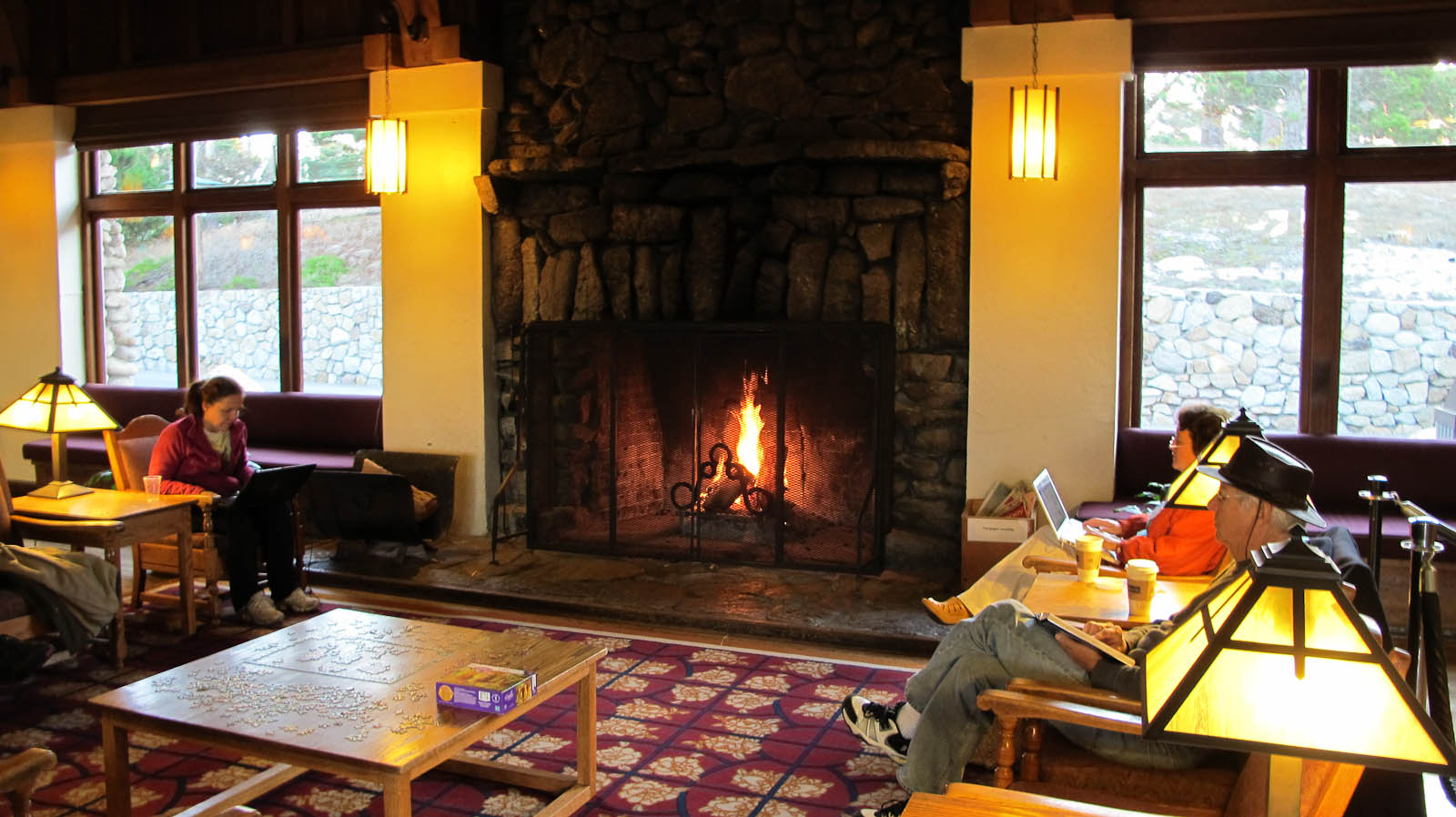

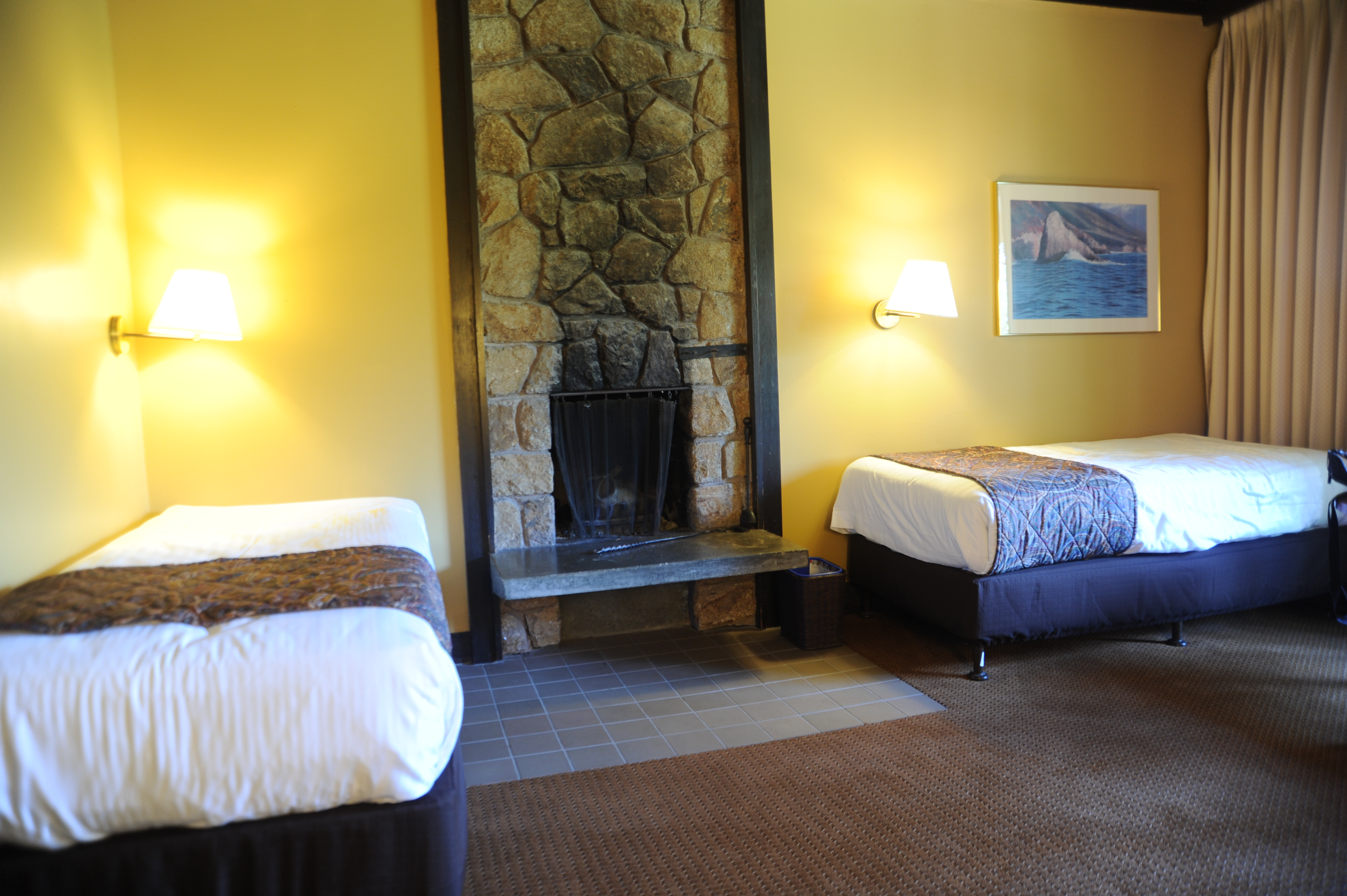

== Notable conferences ==
- 1972 Experimental Nuclear Magnetic Resonance Conference
- 1975: Asilomar Conference on Recombinant DNA
- 1994: Critical Assessment of Techniques for Protein Structure Prediction (inaugural meeting)
- 2010: Asilomar International Conference on Climate Intervention Technologies
- 1969–2012: West Coast Number Theory
- 2014: International Commission on the History of Geological Sciences
- 2017: Asilomar Conference on Beneficial AI
- 2025: Natural Capital Project

== In popular culture ==
The Asilomar Conference Grounds were featured in the film The Shift (2009) by Wayne Dyer, which was shot on location at Asilomar State Beach.

The 1975 Asilomar Conference on Recombinant DNA was prominently featured in the PBS documentary The Gene: An Intimate History.

== See also ==
- List of YWCA buildings
- List of works by Julia Morgan
- List of National Historic Landmarks in California
- National Register of Historic Places listings in Monterey County, California
