= D. H. Lehmer =

American mathematician (1905–1991)

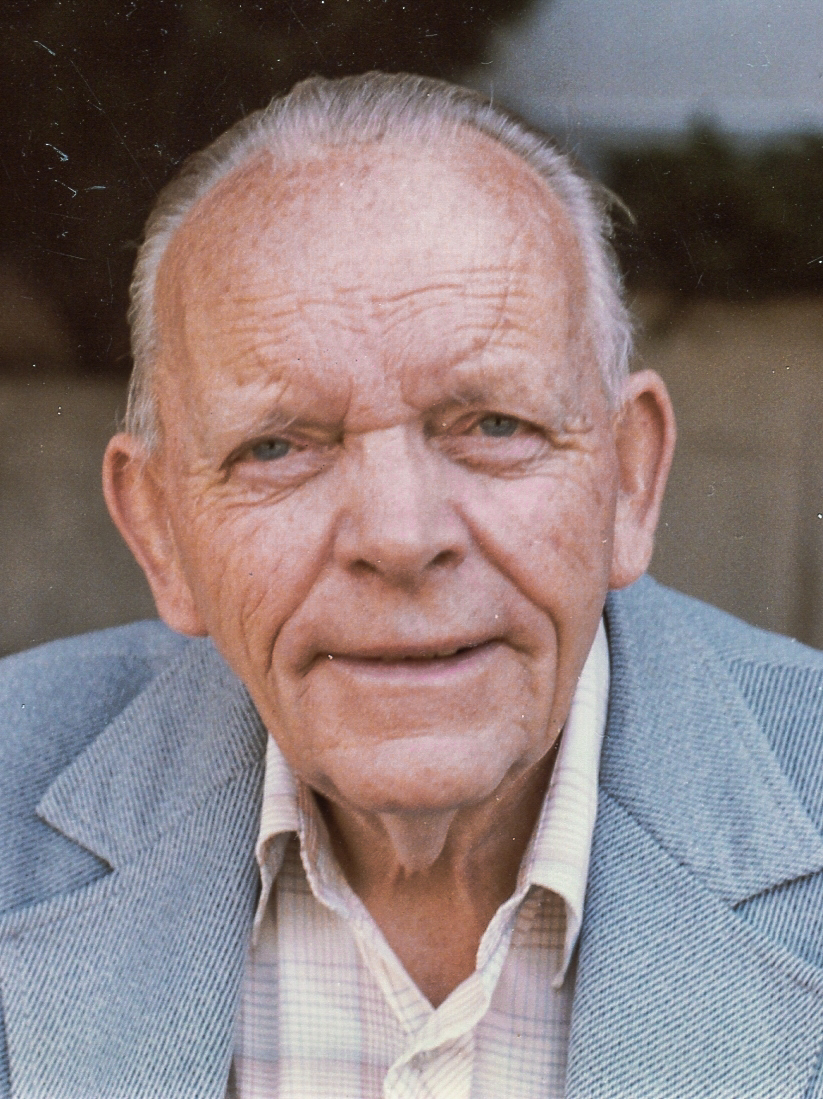
- Lehmer in 1984
- Born: Derrick Henry Lehmer; February 23, 1905; Berkeley, California, U.S.
- Died: May 22, 1991 (aged 86); Berkeley, California, U.S.
- Education: University of California, Berkeley; Brown University
- Known for: Lehmer's polynomial Lehmer matrix Lehmer sieve Lehmer–Schur algorithm Lehmer's GCD algorithm Lehmer code Lehmer's conjecture Lehmer number Lehmer five Lucas–Lehmer test Lehmer mean Meissel–Lehmer algorithm Lehmer pair Pocklington–Lehmer test Lehmer random number generator Lehmer sequence Lehmer's totient problem Continued fraction factorization
- Scientific career
- Fields: Mathematics
- Workplaces: UC Berkeley
- Doctoral advisor: Jacob Tamarkin
- Doctoral students: Tom Apostol; John Brillhart; Ronald Graham; David Singmaster; Harold Stark; Peter J. Weinberger

Derrick Henry "Dick" Lehmer (February 23, 1905 – May 22, 1991), almost always cited as D. H. Lehmer, was an American mathematician significant to the development of computational number theory. Lehmer refined Édouard Lucas' work in the 1930s and devised the Lucas–Lehmer test for Mersenne primes. His peripatetic career as a number theorist, with him and his wife taking numerous types of work in the United States and abroad to support themselves during the Great Depression, fortuitously brought him into the center of research into early electronic computing.

== Early life ==
Lehmer was born in Berkeley, California, to Derrick Norman Lehmer, a professor of mathematics at the University of California, Berkeley, and Clara Eunice Mitchell.

He studied physics and earned a bachelor's degree from UC Berkeley, and continued with graduate studies at the University of Chicago.

He and his father worked together on Lehmer sieves.

== Marriage ==
During his studies at Berkeley, Lehmer met Emma Markovna Trotskaia, a Russian student of his father's, who had begun with work toward an engineering degree but had subsequently switched focus to mathematics, earning her B.A. in 1928. Later that same year, Lehmer married Emma and, following a tour of Northern California and a trip to Japan to meet Emma's family, they moved by car to Providence, Rhode Island, after Brown University offered him an instructorship.

== Career ==
Lehmer received a master's degree and a Ph.D., both from Brown University, in 1929 and 1930, respectively; his wife obtained a master's degree in 1930 as well, coaching mathematics to supplement the family income, while also helping her husband type his Ph.D. thesis, An Extended Theory of Lucas' Functions, which he wrote under Jacob Tamarkin.

=== Movements during the Depression ===
Lehmer became a National Research Fellow, allowing him to take positions at the California Institute of Technology from 1930 to 1931 and at Stanford University from 1931 to 1932. In the latter year, the couple's first child Laura was born.

After being awarded a second National Research Fellowship, the Lehmers moved on to Princeton, New Jersey between 1932 and 1934, where Dick spent a short time at the Institute for Advanced Study.

He worked at Lehigh University in Pennsylvania from 1934 until 1938. Their son Donald was born in 1934 while Dick and Emma were at Lehigh.

The year 1938–1939 was spent in England on a Guggenheim Fellowship visiting both the University of Cambridge and the University of Manchester, meeting G. H. Hardy, John Edensor Littlewood, Harold Davenport, Kurt Mahler, Louis Mordell, and Paul Erdős. The Lehmers returned to America by ship with second child Donald just before the beginning of the Battle of the Atlantic.

Lehmer continued at Lehigh University for the 1939–1940 academic year.

=== Berkeley ===
In 1940, Lehmer accepted a position back at the mathematics department of UC Berkeley. Lehmer was chairman of the Department of Mathematics at University of California, Berkeley from 1954 until 1957. He continued working at UC Berkeley until 1972, the year he became professor emeritus.

Lehmer was involved with the journal Mathematical Tables and Aids to Computation (soon renamed Mathematical Tables and Other Aids to Computation, and renamed Mathematics of Computation in 1960) from its founding in 1943. From 1944 to 1954 inclusive he served as its editor (sometimes jointly).

=== ENIAC and computer science ===
From 1945 to 1946, Lehmer served on the Computations Committee at Aberdeen Proving Grounds in Maryland, a group established as part of the Ballistics Research Laboratory to prepare the ENIAC for utilization following its completion at the University of Pennsylvania's Moore School of Electrical Engineering; the other Computations Committee members were Haskell Curry, Leland Cunningham, and Franz Alt. It was during this short tenure that the Lehmers ran some of the first test programs on the ENIAC—according to their academic interests, these tests involved number theory, especially sieve methods, but also pseudorandom number generation. When they could arrange child care, the Lehmers spent weekends staying up all night running such problems, the first over the Thanksgiving weekend of 1945. (Such tests were run without cost, since the ENIAC would have been left powered on anyway in the interest of minimizing vacuum tube failures.) The problem run during the 3-day Independence Day weekend of July 4, 1946, with John Mauchly serving as computer operator, ran around the clock without interruption or failure. The following Tuesday, July 9, 1946, Lehmer delivered the talk "Computing Machines for Pure Mathematics" as part of the Moore School Lectures, in which he introduced computing as an experimental science, and demonstrated the wit and humor typical of his teaching lectures.

Lehmer would remain active in computing developments for the remainder of his career. Upon his return to Berkeley, he made plans for building the California Digital Computer (CALDIC) with Paul Morton and Leland Cunningham. In September 1949, he presented the pseudorandom number generator now known as the Lehmer random number generator.

D. H. Lehmer wrote the article "The Machine Tools of Combinatorics," which is the first chapter in Edwin Beckenbach's Applied Combinatorial Mathematics (1964). It describes methods for producing permutations, combinations, etc. This was a uniquely valuable resource and has only been rivaled recently by Volume 4 of Donald Knuth's The Art of Computer Programming.

The Lehmers also assisted Harry Vandiver with his work on Fermat's Last Theorem, using the Standards Western Automatic Computer to do many calculations involving Bernoulli numbers.

=== McCarthy era ===
In 1950, Lehmer was one of 31 University of California faculty fired after refusing to sign a loyalty oath, a policy initiated by the Board of Regents of the State of California in 1950 during the Communist scare personified by Senator Joseph McCarthy. Lehmer took a post as Director of the National Bureau of Standards' Institute for Numerical Analysis (INA), working with the Standards Western Automatic Computer (SWAC). On October 17, 1952, the State Supreme Court proclaimed the oath unconstitutional, and Lehmer returned to Berkeley shortly thereafter.

=== Later years ===
Lehmer continued to be active for many years. When John Selfridge was at Northern Illinois University he twice invited Lehmer and Emma to spend a semester there. One year Selfridge arranged that Erdős and Lehmer taught a course together on Research Problems in the Theory of Numbers. Lehmer taught the first eight weeks and then Erdős taught the remainder. Erdős did not often teach a course, and he said, "You know it wasn't that difficult. The only problem was being there."

Lehmer had quite a wit. On the occasion of the first Asilomar number theory conference, which became an annual event (now called West Coast Number Theory), Lehmer, as the organizer, was inspecting the facilities of the Asilomar Conference Grounds—basically a wooden building on the beach. Someone said they could not find a blackboard and Lehmer spotted some curtains in the middle of the wall. Moving the curtains aside revealed a very small blackboard, whereupon Lehmer said "Well, I guess we won't be doing any analytic number theory!"

=== Lasting impact ===
In addition to his significant contributions to number theory algorithms for multiprecision integers, such as factoring, Euclid's algorithm, long division, and proof of primality, he also formulated Lehmer's conjecture and participated in the Cunningham project.

=== Death ===
Lehmer died in Berkeley on May 22, 1991.

== See also ==
- Lucas–Lehmer–Riesel test
- Størmer's theorem
