= Ludwig Lemmer =

German architect (1891 - 1983)

- Born: Hermann Ludwig Lemmer; 9 August 1891; Salemstraße, Remscheid, Germany
- Died: 18 October 1983 (aged 92); Remscheid, Germany

Ludwig Lemmer (9 August 1891, Salemstraße - 18 October 1983, Berlin) was a German architect.

== Early life and education ==
Lemmer was born on 9 August 1891 in Salemstraße, Remscheid to Ernst Ludwig Alexander Lemmer and his wife Eugenie Adleheid Marcus. He attended the Technische Hochschule in Stuttgart (1911-1913). In 1917, he attended the engineering school in Danzig. After his service in World War I, Lemmer visited Denmark and Sweden on a study trip. In 1934, he graduated from the Technische Hochschule in Hanover with a degree in engineering. He also passed the state exams for home economics and geography. He later attended the University of Cologne for three years but did not finish his course.

== Career ==
By 1915, Lemmer was already serving with the 19th infantry battalion (Jägerbataillon) in the Imperial German Army. Following World War I, he became a city planning officer in Remscheid (1921-1933) but was removed from his post by the Nazi Party. He was called up to the Wehrmacht during World War II and saw service in White Russia, France, Sweden, Poland, and Norway in 1941 and 1942. He was posted in Smolensk in 1942 and 1943; in France as part of the 21st Fortress Engineering Staff in 1944; and in Bergheim with the 19th Fortress Engineer Command in late 1944. He was captured by the British Army and spent the rest of the war as a prisoner of war. He was released on 29 June 1945.

Between 1951 and 1955, he taught architecture at Berlin University of the Arts. During this time, he was the Senate of Berlin's Director of Build. In 1958, he and his family returned to Remscheid.

== Awards and honours ==
- Hungarian Great War Campaign Medal with swords
- Austrian Great War Campaign Medal with swords
- The Honour Cross of the World War 1914/1918 with swords
- Iron Cross 2nd class
- War Merit Cross with swords
- Order of Merit of the Federal Republic of Germany

== Personal life ==
On 3 July 1925, he married Charlotte Betty Zehles in Remscheid. Lemmer died on 18 October 1983 in Remscheid. He is buried at the Waldfriedhof Reinshagen.
