= Lehmer sequence =

In mathematics, a Lehmer sequence $U_n(\sqrt R, Q)$ or $V_n(\sqrt R, Q)$ is a generalization of a Lucas sequence $U_n(P, Q)$ or $V_n(P, Q)$, allowing the square root of an integer R in place of the integer P.

To ensure that the value is always an integer, every other term of a Lehmer sequence is divided by √R compared to the corresponding Lucas sequence. That is, when R = P^{2} the Lehmer and Lucas sequences are related as:

$$\begin{align}
P\,U_{2n}(\sqrt{P^2},Q) &= U_{2n}(P,Q) &    U_{2n+1}(\sqrt{P^2},Q) &= U_{2n+1}(P,Q) \\
V_{2n}(\sqrt{P^2},Q) &= V_{2n}(P,Q) & P\,V_{2n+1}(\sqrt{P^2},Q) &= V_{2n+1}(P,Q)
\end{align}$$

== Algebraic relations ==
If a and b are complex numbers with

$$a + b = \sqrt{R}$$
$$ab = Q$$

under the following conditions:

- Q and R are relatively prime nonzero integers
- $a/b$ is not a root of unity.

Then, the corresponding Lehmer numbers are:

$$U_n(\sqrt{R},Q) = \frac{a^n-b^n}{a-b}$$

for n odd, and

$$U_n(\sqrt{R},Q) = \frac{a^n-b^n}{a^2-b^2}$$

for n even.

Their companion numbers are:

$$V_n(\sqrt{R},Q) = \frac{a^n+b^n}{a+b}$$

for n odd and

$$V_n(\sqrt{R},Q) = a^n+b^n$$

for n even.

== Recurrence ==
Lehmer numbers form a linear recurrence relation with

$$U_n = (R-2Q)U_{n-2}-Q^2U_{n-4} = (a^2+b^2)U_{n-2}-a^2b^2U_{n-4}$$

with initial values $U_0=0,\, U_1=1,\, U_2=1,\, U_3=R-Q=a^2+ab+b^2$. Similarly the companion sequence satisfies

$$V_n = (R-2Q)V_{n-2}-Q^2V_{n-4} = (a^2+b^2)V_{n-2}-a^2b^2V_{n-4}$$

with initial values $V_0=2,\, V_1=1,\, V_2=R-2Q=a^2+b^2,\, V_3=R-3Q=a^2-ab+b^2.$

All Lucas sequence recurrences apply to Lehmer sequences if they are divided into cases for even and odd n and appropriate factors of √R are incorporated. For example,

$$\begin{align}
U_{2n}(\sqrt R,Q)   &= \phantom{R\,} U_{2n-1}(\sqrt R,Q) - Q\, U_{2n-2}(\sqrt R,Q) &
U_{2n+1}(\sqrt R,Q) &=          R\,  U_{2n}(\sqrt R,Q)   - Q\, U_{2n-1}(\sqrt R,Q) \\
V_{2n}(\sqrt R,Q)   &=          R\,  V_{2n-1}(\sqrt R,Q) - Q\, V_{2n-2}(\sqrt R,Q) &
V_{2n+1}(\sqrt R,Q) &= \phantom{R\,} V_{2n}(\sqrt R,Q)   - Q\, V_{2n-1}(\sqrt R,Q)
\end{align}$$
