= Derrick Norman Lehmer =

American mathematician (1867–1938)

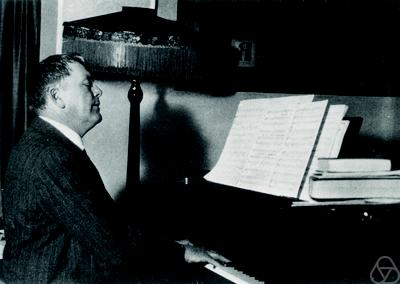
- Born: July 27, 1867; Somerset, Indiana, United States
- Died: September 8, 1938 (aged 71); Berkeley, California, United States
- Education: University of Nebraska; University of Chicago
- Occupation: Mathematician
- Spouse: Clara Eunice Mitchell
- Children: 5, including Derrick Henry

Derrick Norman Lehmer (27 July 1867 – 8 September 1938) was an American mathematician and number theorist.

== Education ==
Lehmer was educated at the University of Nebraska, obtaining his bachelor's degree in 1893 and master's in 1896. His PhD was from the University of Chicago in 1900 for a thesis, Asymptotic Evaluation of Certain Totient-Sums, under the supervision of E. H. Moore.

== Career ==
He was appointed instructor in mathematics at the University of California, Berkeley, in 1900 and married Clara Eunice Mitchell on 12 July 1900 in Decatur, Illinois. He was promoted to professor at Berkeley in 1918 and continued to teach there until retiring in 1937.

In 1903, he presented a factorization of Jevons's number (8,616,460,799) at the San Francisco Section of the American Mathematical Society on December 19, 1903.

He published tables of prime numbers and prime factorizations, reaching 10,017,000 by 1909. He developed a variety of mechanical and electro-mechanical factoring and computational devices, such as the Lehmer sieve, built with his son Derrick Henry Lehmer.

== Selected works ==
- Lehmer, D. N. (1918). "Arithmetical theory of certain Hurwitzian continued fractions". Proc Natl Acad Sci U S A. 4 (8): 214–218. Bibcode:1918PNAS....4..214L. doi:10.1073/pnas.4.8.214. PMC 1091449. PMID 16576302.
- Lehmer, D. N. (1918). "On Jacobi's extension of the continued fraction algorithm". Proc Natl Acad Sci U S A. 4 (12): 360–364. Bibcode:1918PNAS....4..360L. doi:10.1073/pnas.4.12.360. PMC 1091496. PMID 16576328.
- Lehmer, D. N. (1925). "On a new method of factorization". Proc Natl Acad Sci U S A. 11 (1): 97–98. Bibcode:1925PNAS...11...97L. doi:10.1073/pnas.11.1.97. PMC 1085844. PMID 16586982.
- Lehmer, D. N. (1927). "A theorem on factorization". Bull. Amer. Math. Soc. 33 (1): 35–36. doi:10.1090/s0002-9904-1927-04299-9. MR 1561316.
- Lehmer, D. N. (1931). "Inverse ternary continued fractions". Bull. Amer. Math. Soc. 37 (8): 565–569. doi:10.1090/s0002-9904-1931-05206-x. MR 1562198.
- Lehmer, D. N. (1934). "On the enumeration of magic cubes". Bull. Amer. Math. Soc. 40 (12): 833–837. doi:10.1090/s0002-9904-1934-05976-7. MR 1562983.
