= Transcendental number theory =

Study of numbers that are not solutions of polynomials with rational coefficients

Transcendental number theory is a branch of number theory that investigates transcendental numbers (numbers that are not solutions of any polynomial equation with rational coefficients), in both qualitative and quantitative ways.

== Transcendence ==
The fundamental theorem of algebra tells us that if we have a non-constant polynomial with rational coefficients (or equivalently, by clearing denominators, with integer coefficients) then that polynomial will have a root in the complex numbers. That is, for any non-constant polynomial $P$ with rational coefficients there will be a complex number $\alpha$ such that $P(\alpha)=0$. Transcendence theory is concerned with the converse question: given a complex number $\alpha$, is there a polynomial $P$ with rational coefficients such that $P(\alpha)=0?$ If no such polynomial exists then the number is called transcendental.

More generally the theory deals with algebraic independence of numbers. A set of numbers {α_{1}, α_{2}, …, α_{n}} is called algebraically independent over a field K if there is no non-zero polynomial P in n variables with coefficients in K such that P(α_{1}, α_{2}, …, α_{n}) = 0. So working out if a given number is transcendental is really a special case of algebraic independence where n = 1 and the field K is the field of rational numbers.

A related notion is whether there is a closed-form expression for a number, including exponentials and logarithms as well as algebraic operations. There are various definitions of "closed-form", and questions about closed-form can often be reduced to questions about transcendence.

== History ==
=== Approximation by rational numbers: Liouville to Roth ===
Use of the term transcendental to refer to an object that is not algebraic dates back to the seventeenth century, when Gottfried Leibniz proved that the sine function was not an algebraic function. The question of whether certain classes of numbers could be transcendental dates back to 1748 when Euler asserted that the number log_{a}b was not algebraic for rational numbers a and b provided b is not of the form b = a^{c} for some rational c.

Euler's assertion was not proved until the twentieth century, but almost a hundred years after his claim Joseph Liouville did manage to prove the existence of numbers that are not algebraic, something that until then had not been known for sure. His original papers on the matter in the 1840s sketched out arguments using simple continued fractions to construct transcendental numbers. Later, in the 1850s, he gave a necessary condition for a number to be algebraic, and thus a sufficient condition for a number to be transcendental. This transcendence criterion was not strong enough to be necessary too, and indeed it fails to detect that the number e is transcendental. But his work did provide a larger class of transcendental numbers, now known as Liouville numbers in his honour.

Liouville's criterion essentially said that algebraic numbers cannot be very well approximated by rational numbers. So if a number can be very well approximated by rational numbers then it must be transcendental. The exact meaning of "very well approximated" in Liouville's work relates to a certain exponent. He showed that if α is an algebraic number of degree d ≥ 2 and ε is any number greater than zero, then the expression

$$\left|\alpha-\frac{p}{q}\right|<\frac{1}{q^{d+\varepsilon}}$$

can be satisfied by only finitely many rational numbers p/q. Using this as a criterion for transcendence is not trivial, as one must check whether there are infinitely many solutions p/q for every d ≥ 2.

In the twentieth century work by Axel Thue, Carl Siegel, and Klaus Roth reduced the exponent in Liouville's work from d + ε to d/2 + 1 + ε, and finally, in 1955, to 2 + ε. This result, known as the Thue–Siegel–Roth theorem, is ostensibly the best possible, since if the exponent 2 + ε is replaced by just 2 then the result is no longer true. However, Serge Lang conjectured an improvement of Roth's result; in particular he conjectured that q^{2+ε} in the denominator of the right-hand side could be reduced to $q^{2}(\log q)^{1+ \epsilon}$.

Roth's work effectively ended the work started by Liouville, and his theorem allowed mathematicians to prove the transcendence of many more numbers, such as the Champernowne constant. The theorem is still not strong enough to detect all transcendental numbers, though, and many famous constants including e and π either are not or are not known to be very well approximable in the above sense.

=== Auxiliary functions: Hermite to Baker ===
Fortunately other methods were pioneered in the nineteenth century to deal with the algebraic properties of e, and consequently of π through Euler's identity. This work centred on use of the so-called auxiliary function. These are functions which typically have many zeros at the points under consideration. Here "many zeros" may mean many distinct zeros, or as few as one zero but with a high multiplicity, or even many zeros all with high multiplicity. Charles Hermite used auxiliary functions that approximated the functions $e^{kx}$ for each natural number $k$ in order to prove the transcendence of $e$ in 1873. His work was built upon by Ferdinand von Lindemann in the 1880s in order to prove that e^{α} is transcendental for nonzero algebraic numbers α. In particular this proved that π is transcendental since e^{πi} is algebraic, and thus answered in the negative the problem of antiquity as to whether it was possible to square the circle. Karl Weierstrass developed their work yet further and eventually proved the Lindemann–Weierstrass theorem in 1885.

In 1900 David Hilbert posed his famous collection of problems. The seventh of these, and one of the hardest in Hilbert's estimation, asked about the transcendence of numbers of the form a^{b} where a and b are algebraic, a is not zero or one, and b is irrational. In the 1930s Alexander Gelfond and Theodor Schneider proved that all such numbers were indeed transcendental using a non-explicit auxiliary function whose existence was granted by Siegel's lemma. This result, the Gelfond–Schneider theorem, proved the transcendence of numbers such as e^{π} and the Gelfond–Schneider constant.

The next big result in this field occurred in the 1960s, when Alan Baker made progress on a problem posed by Gelfond on linear forms in logarithms. Gelfond himself had managed to find a non-trivial lower bound for the quantity

$$|\beta_1\log\alpha_1 +\beta_2\log\alpha_2|\,$$

where all four unknowns are algebraic, the αs being neither zero nor one and the βs being irrational. Finding similar lower bounds for the sum of three or more logarithms had eluded Gelfond, though. The proof of Baker's theorem contained such bounds, solving Gauss' class number problem for class number one in the process. This work won Baker the Fields Medal for its uses in solving Diophantine equations. From a purely transcendental number theoretic viewpoint, Baker had proved that if α_{1}, ..., α_{n} are algebraic numbers, none of them zero or one, and β_{1}, ..., β_{n} are algebraic numbers such that 1, β_{1}, ..., β_{n} are linearly independent over the rational numbers, then the number

$$\alpha_1^{\beta_1}\alpha_2^{\beta_2}\cdots\alpha_n^{\beta_n}$$

is transcendental.

=== Other techniques: Cantor and Zilber ===
In the 1870s, Georg Cantor started to develop set theory and, in 1874, published a paper proving that the algebraic numbers could be put in one-to-one correspondence with the set of natural numbers, and thus that the set of transcendental numbers must be uncountable. Later, in 1891, Cantor used his more familiar diagonal argument to prove the same result. While Cantor's result is often quoted as being purely existential and thus unusable for constructing a single transcendental number, the proofs in both the aforementioned papers give methods to construct transcendental numbers.

While Cantor used set theory to prove the plenitude of transcendental numbers, a recent development has been the use of model theory in attempts to prove an unsolved problem in transcendental number theory. The problem is to determine the transcendence degree of the field

$$K=\mathbb{Q}(x_1,\ldots,x_n,e^{x_1},\ldots,e^{x_n})$$

for complex numbers x_{1}, ..., x_{n} that are linearly independent over the rational numbers. Stephen Schanuel conjectured that the answer is at least n, but no proof is known. In 2004, though, Boris Zilber published a paper that used model theoretic techniques to create a structure that behaves very much like the complex numbers equipped with the operations of addition, multiplication, and exponentiation. Moreover, in this abstract structure Schanuel's conjecture does indeed hold. Unfortunately it is not yet known that this structure is in fact the same as the complex numbers with the operations mentioned; there could exist some other abstract structure that behaves very similarly to the complex numbers but where Schanuel's conjecture doesn't hold. Zilber did provide several criteria that would prove the structure in question was C, but could not prove the so-called Strong Exponential Closure axiom. The simplest case of this axiom has since been proved, but a proof that it holds in full generality is required to complete the proof of the conjecture.

== Approaches ==
A typical problem in this area of mathematics is to work out whether a given number is transcendental. Cantor used a cardinality argument to show that there are only countably many algebraic numbers, and hence almost all numbers are transcendental. Transcendental numbers therefore represent the typical case; even so, it may be extremely difficult to prove that a given number is transcendental (or even simply irrational).

For this reason transcendence theory often works towards a more quantitative approach. So given a particular complex number α one can ask how close α is to being an algebraic number. For example, if one supposes that the number α is algebraic then can one show that it must have very high degree or a minimum polynomial with very large coefficients? Ultimately if it is possible to show that no finite degree or size of coefficient is sufficient then the number must be transcendental. Since a number α is transcendental if and only if P(α) ≠ 0 for every non-zero polynomial P with integer coefficients, this problem can be approached by trying to find lower bounds of the form

$$|P(a)| > F(A,d)$$

where the right hand side is some positive function depending on some measure A of the size of the coefficients of P, and its degree d, and such that these lower bounds apply to all P ≠ 0. Such a bound is called a transcendence measure.

The case of d = 1 is that of "classical" diophantine approximation asking for lower bounds for

$$|ax + b|$$.

The methods of transcendence theory and diophantine approximation have much in common: they both use the auxiliary function concept.

== Major results ==
The Gelfond–Schneider theorem was the major advance in transcendence theory in the period 1900–1950. In the 1960s the method of Alan Baker on linear forms in logarithms of algebraic numbers reanimated transcendence theory, with applications to numerous classical problems and diophantine equations.

== Mahler's classification ==
Kurt Mahler in 1932 partitioned the transcendental numbers into 3 classes, called S, T, and U. Definition of these classes draws on an extension of the idea of a Liouville number (cited above).

=== Measure of irrationality of a real number ===
One way to define a Liouville number is to consider how small a given real number x makes linear polynomials |qx − p| without making them exactly 0. Here p, q are integers with |p|, |q| bounded by a positive integer H.

Let $m(x, 1, H)$ be the minimum non-zero absolute value these polynomials take and take:

$$\omega(x, 1, H) = -\frac{\log m(x, 1, H)}{\log H}$$
$$\omega(x, 1) = \limsup_{H\to\infty}\, \omega(x,1,H).$$

ω(x, 1) is often called the measure of irrationality of a real number x. For rational numbers, ω(x, 1) = 0 and is at least 1 for irrational real numbers. A Liouville number is defined to have infinite measure of irrationality. Roth's theorem says that irrational real algebraic numbers have measure of irrationality 1.

=== Measure of transcendence of a complex number ===
Next consider the values of polynomials at a complex number x, when these polynomials have integer coefficients, degree at most n, and height at most H, with n, H being positive integers.

Let $m(x, n, H)$ be the minimum non-zero absolute value such polynomials take at $x$ and take:

$$\omega(x, n, H) = -\frac{\log m(x, n, H)}{n\log H}$$
$$\omega(x, n) = \limsup_{H\to\infty}\, \omega(x,n,H).$$

Suppose this is infinite for some minimum positive integer n. A complex number x in this case is called a U number of degree n.

Now we can define

$$\omega (x) = \limsup_{n\to\infty}\, \omega(x,n).$$

ω(x) is often called the measure of transcendence of x. If the ω(x, n) are bounded, then ω(x) is finite, and x is called an S number. If the ω(x, n) are finite but unbounded, x is called a T number. x is algebraic if and only if ω(x) = 0.

Clearly the Liouville numbers are a subset of the U numbers. William LeVeque in 1953 constructed U numbers of any desired degree. The Liouville numbers and hence the U numbers are uncountable sets. They are sets of measure 0.

T numbers also comprise a set of measure 0. It took about 35 years to show their existence. Wolfgang M. Schmidt in 1968 showed that examples exist. However, almost all complex numbers are S numbers. Mahler proved that the exponential function sends all non-zero algebraic numbers to S numbers: this shows that e is an S number and gives a proof of the transcendence of π. This number π is known not to be a U number. Many other transcendental numbers remain unclassified.

Two numbers x, y are called algebraically dependent if there is a non-zero polynomial P in two indeterminates with integer coefficients such that P(x, y) = 0. There is a powerful theorem that two complex numbers that are algebraically dependent belong to the same Mahler class. This allows construction of new transcendental numbers, such as the sum of a Liouville number with e or π.

The symbol S probably stood for the name of Mahler's teacher Carl Ludwig Siegel, and T and U are just the next two letters.

=== Koksma's equivalent classification ===
Jurjen Koksma in 1939 proposed another classification based on approximation by algebraic numbers.

Consider the approximation of a complex number x by algebraic numbers of degree ≤ n and height ≤ H. Let α be an algebraic number of this finite set such that |x − α| has the minimum positive value. Define ω*(x, H, n) and ω*(x, n) by:

$$|x-\alpha| = H^{-n\omega^*(x,H,n)-1}.$$
$$\omega^*(x,n) = \limsup_{H\to\infty}\, \omega^*(x,n,H).$$

If for a smallest positive integer n, ω*(x, n) is infinite, x is called a U*-number of degree n.

If the ω*(x, n) are bounded and do not converge to 0, x is called an S*-number,

A number x is called an A*-number if the ω*(x, n) converge to 0.

If the ω*(x, n) are all finite but unbounded, x is called a T*-number,

Koksma's and Mahler's classifications are equivalent in that they divide the transcendental numbers into the same classes. The A*-numbers are the algebraic numbers.

=== LeVeque's construction ===
Let

$$\lambda= \tfrac{1}{3} + \sum_{k=1}^\infty 10^{-k!}.$$

It can be shown that the nth root of λ (a Liouville number) is a U-number of degree n.

This construction can be improved to create an uncountable family of U-numbers of degree n. Let Z be the set consisting of every other power of 10 in the series above for λ. The set of all subsets of Z is uncountable. Deleting any of the subsets of Z from the series for λ creates uncountably many distinct Liouville numbers, whose nth roots are U-numbers of degree n.

=== Type ===
The supremum of the sequence {ω(x, n)} is called the type. Almost all real numbers are S numbers of type 1, which is minimal for real S numbers. Almost all complex numbers are S numbers of type 1/2, which is also minimal. The claims of almost all numbers were conjectured by Mahler and in 1965 proved by Vladimir Sprindzhuk.

== Open problems ==
While the Gelfond–Schneider theorem proved that a large class of numbers was transcendental, this class was still countable. Many well-known mathematical constants are still not known to be transcendental, and in some cases it is not even known whether they are rational or irrational. A partial list can be found here.

A major problem in transcendence theory is showing that a particular set of numbers is algebraically independent rather than just showing that individual elements are transcendental. So while we know that e and π are transcendental that doesn't imply that e + π is transcendental, nor other combinations of the two (except e^{π}, Gelfond's constant, which is known to be transcendental). Another major problem is dealing with numbers that are not related to the exponential function. The main results in transcendence theory tend to revolve around e and the logarithm function, which means that wholly new methods tend to be required to deal with numbers that cannot be expressed in terms of these two objects in an elementary fashion.

Schanuel's conjecture would solve the first of these problems somewhat as it deals with algebraic independence and would indeed confirm that e + π is transcendental. It still revolves around the exponential function, however, and so would not necessarily deal with numbers such as Apéry's constant or the Euler–Mascheroni constant. Another extremely difficult unsolved problem is the so-called constant or identity problem.
