= Schanuel's conjecture =

Major unsolved problem in transcendental number theory

In mathematics, specifically transcendental number theory, Schanuel's conjecture is a conjecture about the transcendence degree of certain field extensions of the rational numbers $\mathbb{Q}$, which would establish the transcendence of a large class of numbers, for which this is currently unknown. It is due to Stephen Schanuel and was published by Serge Lang in 1966.

== Statement ==
Schanuel's conjecture can be given as follows:

Schanuel's conjecture—Given any set of $n$ complex numbers $\{z_1,...,z_n\}$ that are linearly independent over $\mathbb Q$, the field extension $\mathbb Q (z_1,...,z_n,e^{z_1},...,e^{z_n})$ has transcendence degree at least $n$ over $\mathbb Q$.

== Consequences ==
Schanuel's conjecture, if proven, would generalize most known results in transcendental number theory and establish a large class of numbers transcendental. Special cases of Schanuel's conjecture include:

=== Lindemann–Weierstrass theorem ===
Considering Schanuel's conjecture for only $n=1$ gives that for a nonzero complex number $z$, at least one of the numbers $z$ and $e^z$ must be transcendental. This was proved by Ferdinand von Lindemann in 1882.

If the numbers $z_1,...,z_n$ are taken to be all algebraic and linearly independent over $\mathbb Q$ then the $e^{z_1},...,e^{z_n}$ result to be transcendental and algebraically independent over $\mathbb Q$. The first proof for this more general result was given by Carl Weierstrass in 1885.

This so-called Lindemann–Weierstrass theorem implies the transcendence of the numbers e and π. It also follows that for algebraic numbers $\alpha$ not equal to 0 or 1, both $e^\alpha$ and $\ln(\alpha)$ are transcendental. It further gives the transcendence of the trigonometric functions at nonzero algebraic values.

=== Baker's theorem ===
Another special case was proved by Alan Baker in 1966: If complex numbers $\lambda_1,...,\lambda_n$ are chosen to be linearly independent over the rational numbers $\mathbb Q$ such that $e^{\lambda_1},...,e^{\lambda_n}$ are algebraic, then $\lambda_1,...,\lambda_n$ are also linearly independent over the algebraic numbers $\mathbb \overline{Q}$.

Schanuel's conjecture would strengthen this result, implying that $\lambda_1,...,\lambda_n$ would also be algebraically independent over $\mathbb Q$ (and equivalently over $\mathbb \overline{Q}$).

=== Gelfond–Schneider theorem ===
In 1934 it was proved by Aleksander Gelfond and Theodor Schneider that if $\alpha$ and $\beta$ are two algebraic complex numbers with $\alpha\notin\{0,1\}$ and $\beta\notin \mathbb Q$, then $\alpha^\beta$ is transcendental.

This establishes the transcendence of numbers like Hilbert's constant $2^\sqrt{2}$ and Gelfond's constant $e^\pi$.

The Gelfond–Schneider theorem follows from Schanuel's conjecture by setting $n=3$ and $z_1=\beta, z_2=\ln\alpha, z_3=\beta \ln\alpha$. It also would follow from Baker's theorem above via $\lambda_1=\ln\alpha, \lambda_2=\beta\ln\alpha$.

=== Four exponentials conjecture ===
The currently unproven four exponentials conjecture would also follow from Schanuel's conjecture: If $z_1,z_2$ and $w_1,w_2$ are two pairs of complex numbers, with each pair being linearly independent over the rational numbers, then at least one of the following four numbers is transcendental:

$$e^{z_1w_1}, e^{z_1w_2}, e^{z_2w_1}, e^{z_2w_2}.$$

The four exponential conjecture would imply that for any irrational number $t$, at least one of the numbers $2^t$ and $3^t$ is transcendental. It also implies that if $t$ is a positive real number such that both $2^t$ and $3^t$ are integers, then $t$ itself must be an integer. The related six exponentials theorem has been proven.

=== Other consequences ===
Schanuel's conjecture, if proved, would also establish many nontrivial combinations of e, π, algebraic numbers and elementary functions to be transcendental:

$$e+\pi, e\pi, e^{\pi^2}, e^e, \pi^e, \pi^\sqrt{2}, \pi^\pi, \pi^{\pi^\pi}, \, \log\pi, \,  \log\log2, \, \sin e, ...$$

In particular it would follow that e and π are algebraically independent simply by setting $z_1=1$ and $z_2=i\pi$.

Euler's identity states that $e^{i\pi}+1=0$. If Schanuel's conjecture is true then this is, in some precise sense involving exponential rings, the only non-trivial relation between e, π, and i over the complex numbers.

MacIntyre showed in 1990 that Schanuel's conjecture implies there are no hidden iterated exponential identities for exponential constants, and the exponential subring of the real numbers generated by 1 is the free exponential ring on no generators.

== Related conjectures and results ==
The converse Schanuel conjecture is the following statement:

Suppose F is a countable field with characteristic 0, and e : F → F is a homomorphism from the additive group (F,+) to the multiplicative group (F,·) whose kernel is cyclic. Suppose further that for any n elements x_{1},...,x_{n} of F which are linearly independent over $\mathbb{Q}$, the extension field $\mathbb{Q}$(x_{1},...,x_{n},e(x_{1}),...,e(x_{n})) has transcendence degree at least n over $\mathbb{Q}$. Then there exists a field homomorphism h : F → $\mathbb{C}$ such that h(e(x)) = exp(h(x)) for all x in F.

A version of Schanuel's conjecture for formal power series, also by Schanuel, was proven by James Ax in 1971. It states:

Given any n formal power series f_{1},...,f_{n} in t$\mathbb{C}$[[t]] which are linearly independent over $\mathbb{Q}$, then the field extension $\mathbb{C}$(t,f_{1},...,f_{n},exp(f_{1}),...,exp(f_{n})) has transcendence degree at least n over $\mathbb{C}$(t).

Although ostensibly a problem in number theory, Schanuel's conjecture has implications in model theory as well. Angus Macintyre and Alex Wilkie, for example, proved that the theory of the real field with exponentiation, $\mathbb{R}$_{exp}, is decidable provided Schanuel's conjecture is true. In fact, to prove this result, they only needed the real version of the conjecture, which is as follows:

Suppose x_{1},...,x_{n} are real numbers and the transcendence degree of the field $\mathbb{Q}$(x_{1},...,x_{n}, exp(x_{1}),...,exp(x_{n})) is strictly less than n, then there are integers m_{1},...,m_{n}, not all zero, such that m_{1}x_{1} +...+ m_{n}x_{n} = 0.

This would be a positive solution to Tarski's exponential function problem.

A related conjecture called the uniform real Schanuel's conjecture essentially says the same but puts a bound on the integers m_{i}. The uniform real version of the conjecture is equivalent to the standard real version. Macintyre and Wilkie showed that a consequence of Schanuel's conjecture, which they dubbed the Weak Schanuel's conjecture, was equivalent to the decidability of $\mathbb{R}$_{exp}. This conjecture states that there is a computable upper bound on the norm of non-singular solutions to systems of exponential polynomials; this is, non-obviously, a consequence of Schanuel's conjecture for the reals.

It is also known that Schanuel's conjecture would be a consequence of conjectural results in the theory of motives. In this setting Grothendieck's period conjecture for an abelian variety A states that the transcendence degree of its period matrix is the same as the dimension of the associated Mumford–Tate group, and what is known by work of Pierre Deligne is that the dimension is an upper bound for the transcendence degree. Bertolin has shown how a generalised period conjecture includes Schanuel's conjecture.

== Zilber's pseudo-exponentiation ==
While a proof of Schanuel's conjecture seems a long way off, as reviewed by Michel Waldschmidt in the year 2000, connections with model theory have prompted a surge of research on the conjecture.

In 2004, Boris Zilber systematically constructed exponential fields K_{exp} that are algebraically closed and of characteristic zero, and such that one of these fields exists for each uncountable cardinality. He axiomatised these fields and, using Hrushovski's construction and techniques inspired by work of Shelah on categoricity in infinitary logics, proved that this theory of "pseudo-exponentiation" has a unique model in each uncountable cardinal. Schanuel's conjecture is part of this axiomatisation, and so the natural conjecture that the unique model of cardinality continuum is actually isomorphic to the complex exponential field implies Schanuel's conjecture. In fact, Zilber showed that this conjecture holds if and only if both Schanuel's conjecture and the Exponential-Algebraic Closedness conjecture hold. As this construction can also give models with counterexamples of Schanuel's conjecture, this method cannot prove Schanuel's conjecture.

== See also ==
- Four exponentials conjecture
- Algebraic independence
- List of unsolved problems in mathematics
- Existential Closedness conjecture
- Zilber–Pink conjecture
- Pregeometry

== Sources ==
- Weierstrass, K. (1885), "Zu Lindemann's Abhandlung. "Über die Ludolph'sche Zahl".", Sitzungsberichte der Königlich Preussischen Akademie der Wissenschaften zu Berlin, 5: 1067–1085
