= Lemniscate constant =

Ratio of the perimeter of Bernoulli's lemniscate to its diameter

Lemniscate of Bernoulli

In mathematics, the lemniscate constant ϖ is a transcendental mathematical constant that is the ratio of the perimeter of Bernoulli's lemniscate to its diameter, analogous to the definition of π for the circle. Equivalently, the perimeter of the lemniscate $(x^2+y^2)^2=x^2-y^2$ is $2\varpi$. The lemniscate constant is closely related to the lemniscate elliptic functions and is approximately equal to 2.62205755. It also appears in evaluation of the gamma and beta function at certain rational values. The symbol ϖ is a cursive variant of π known as variant pi represented in Unicode by the character U+03D6 ϖ GREEK PI SYMBOL.

Sometimes the quantities 2ϖ or ϖ/2 are referred to as the lemniscate constant.

== History ==
Gauss's constant, denoted by G, is equal to ϖ / π ≈ 0.8346268 and named after Carl Friedrich Gauss, who calculated it via the arithmetic–geometric mean as $1/M\bigl(1,\sqrt{2}\bigr)$. By 1799, Gauss had two proofs of the theorem that $M\bigl(1,\sqrt2\bigr)=\pi/\varpi$ where $\varpi$ is the lemniscate constant.

John Todd named two more lemniscate constants, the first lemniscate constant A = ϖ/2 ≈ 1.3110287771 and the second lemniscate constant B = π/(2ϖ) ≈ 0.5990701173.

The lemniscate constant $\varpi$ and Todd's first lemniscate constant $A$ were proven transcendental by Carl Ludwig Siegel in 1932 and later by Theodor Schneider in 1937 and Todd's second lemniscate constant $B$ and Gauss's constant $G$ were proven transcendental by Theodor Schneider in 1941. In 1975, Gregory Chudnovsky proved that $\pi$ and $\varpi$ are algebraically independent over $\mathbb{Q}$, which implies that $A$ and $B$ are algebraically independent as well. But the set $\bigl\{\pi,M\bigl(1,1/\sqrt{2}\bigr),M'\bigl(1,1/\sqrt{2}\bigr)\bigr\}$ (where the prime denotes the derivative with respect to the second variable) is not algebraically independent over $\mathbb{Q}$. In fact,
$$\pi=2\sqrt{2}\frac{M^3\left(1,\frac{1}{\sqrt{2}}\right)}{M'\left(1,\frac{1}{\sqrt{2}}\right)}=\frac{1}{G^3 M'\left(1,\frac{1}{\sqrt{2}}\right)}.$$
In 1996, Yuri Nesterenko proved that e^{π}, $\pi$, and $\varpi$ are algebraically independent over $\mathbb{Q}$.

As of 2025 over 2 trillion digits of this constant have been calculated using y-cruncher.

== Forms ==
Usually, $\varpi$ is defined by the first equality below, but it has many equivalent forms:

$$\begin{aligned}
\varpi
&= 2\int_0^1\frac{dt}{\sqrt{1-t^4}}
= \sqrt2\int_0^\infty\frac{dt}{\sqrt{1+t^4}}
= \int_0^1\frac{dt}{\sqrt{t-t^3}}
= \int_1^\infty \frac{dt}{\sqrt{t^3-t}}\\[6mu]
&= 4\int_0^\infty\Bigl(\sqrt[4]{1+t^{4}}-t\Bigr)dt
= 2\sqrt2\int_0^1 \sqrt[4]{1-t^{4}}\mathop{dt} =3\int_0^1 \sqrt{1-t^4}dt\\[2mu]
&= 2K(i)
= \tfrac{1}{2}\Beta\bigl( \tfrac14, \tfrac12\bigr)
= \tfrac{1}{2\sqrt2}\Beta\bigl( \tfrac14, \tfrac14\bigr)
= \frac{\Gamma (1/4)^2}{2\sqrt{2\pi}}
= \frac{2-\sqrt2}{4}\frac{\zeta(3/4)^2}{\zeta(1/4)^2}\\[5mu]
&= 2.62205\;75542\;92119\;81046\;48395\;89891\;11941\ldots,
\end{aligned}$$

where K is the complete elliptic integral of the first kind with modulus k, Β is the beta function, Γ is the gamma function and ζ is the Riemann zeta function.

The lemniscate constant can also be computed by the arithmetic–geometric mean $M$,

$$\varpi=\frac{\pi}{M\bigl(1,\sqrt2\bigr)}.$$

Gauss's constant is typically defined as the reciprocal of the arithmetic–geometric mean of 1 and the square root of 2, after his calculation of $M\bigl(1, \sqrt2\bigr)$ published in 1800:
$$G = \frac{1}{M\bigl(1, \sqrt2\bigr)}$$
John Todd's lemniscate constants may be given in terms of the beta function B:
$$\begin{aligned}
A &= \frac\varpi2 = \tfrac14 \Beta \bigl(\tfrac14,\tfrac12\bigr), \\[3mu]
B &= \frac{\pi}{2\varpi} =\tfrac14\Beta \bigl(\tfrac12,\tfrac34\bigr).
\end{aligned}$$

=== As a special value of L-functions ===
$$\beta'(0)=\log\frac{\varpi}{\sqrt{\pi}}$$

which is analogous to

$$\zeta'(0)=\log\frac{1}{\sqrt{2\pi}}$$

where $\beta$ is the Dirichlet beta function and $\zeta$ is the Riemann zeta function.

Analogously to the Leibniz formula for π,
$$\beta (1)=\sum_{n=1}^\infty \frac{\chi (n)}{n}=\frac{\pi}{4},$$
we have
$$L(E,1)=\sum_{n=1}^\infty \frac{\nu (n)}{n}=\frac{\varpi}{4}$$
where $L$ is the L-function of the elliptic curve $E:\, y^2=x^3-x$ over $\mathbb{Q}$; this means that $\nu$ is the multiplicative function given by
$$\nu (p^n)=\begin{cases}
p - \mathcal{N}_p,                   & p\in\mathbb{P}, \, n=1 \\[5mu]
0,                                   & p=2,\, n\ge 2 \\[5mu]
\nu (p)\nu (p^{n-1})-p\nu (p^{n-2}), & p\in\mathbb{P}\setminus\{2\},\, n\ge 2
\end{cases}$$
where $\mathcal{N}_p$ is the number of solutions of the congruence
$$a^3-a\equiv b^2 \,(\operatorname{mod}p),\quad p\in\mathbb{P}$$
in variables $a,b$ that are non-negative integers ($\mathbb{P}$ is the set of all primes). Equivalently, $\nu$ is given by
$$F(\tau)=\eta (4\tau)^2\eta (8\tau)^2=\sum_{n=1}^\infty \nu (n) q^n,\quad q=e^{2\pi i\tau}$$
where $\tau\in\mathbb{C}$ such that $\operatorname{\Im}\tau >0$ and $\eta$ is the eta function. The above result can be equivalently written as
$$\sum_{n=1}^\infty \frac{\nu (n)}{n}e^{-2\pi n/\sqrt{32}}=\frac{\varpi}{8}$$
(the number $32$ is the conductor of $E$) and also tells us that the BSD conjecture is true for the above $E$. The first few values of $\nu$ are given by the following table; if $1\le n\le 113$ such that $n$ doesn't appear in the table, then $\nu (n)=0$:
$$\begin{array}{r|r|r|r}
n & \nu (n) & n & \nu (n) \\
\hline
1 & 1 & 53 & 14 \\
5 & -2 & 61 & -10 \\
9 & -3 & 65 & -12 \\
13 & 6 & 73 & -6 \\
17 & 2 & 81 & 9 \\
25 & -1 & 85 & -4 \\
29 & -10 & 89 & 10\\
37 & -2 & 97 & 18 \\
41 & 10 & 101 & -2 \\
45 & 6 & 109 & 6 \\
49 & -7 & 113 & -14 \\
\end{array}$$

=== As a special value of other functions ===
Let $\Delta$ be the minimal weight level $1$ new form. Then
$$\Delta (i)=\frac{1}{64}\left(\frac{\varpi}{\pi}\right)^{12}.$$
The $q$-coefficient of $\Delta$ is the Ramanujan tau function.

== Series ==
Viète's formula for π can be written:

$$\frac2\pi = \sqrt\frac12 \cdot \sqrt{\frac12 + \frac12\sqrt\frac12} \cdot \sqrt{\frac12 + \frac12\sqrt{\frac12 + \frac12\sqrt\frac12}} \cdots$$

An analogous formula for ϖ is:

$$\frac2\varpi = \sqrt\frac12 \cdot \sqrt{\frac12 +  \frac12 \bigg/ \!\sqrt\frac12} \cdot \sqrt{\frac12 +  \frac12 \Bigg/ \!\sqrt{\frac12 +  \frac12 \bigg/ \!\sqrt\frac12}} \cdots$$

The Wallis product for π is:

$$\frac{\pi}{2} = \prod_{n=1}^\infty \left(1+\frac{1}{n}\right)^{(-1)^{n+1}}=\prod_{n=1}^{\infty} \left(\frac{2n}{2n-1} \cdot \frac{2n}{2n+1}\right)
= \biggl(\frac{2}{1} \cdot \frac{2}{3}\biggr) \biggl(\frac{4}{3} \cdot \frac{4}{5}\biggr) \biggl(\frac{6}{5} \cdot \frac{6}{7}\biggr) \cdots$$

An analogous formula for ϖ is:

$$\frac{\varpi}{2} = \prod_{n=1}^\infty \left(1+\frac{1}{2n}\right)^{(-1)^{n+1}}=\prod_{n=1}^{\infty} \left(\frac{4n-1}{4n-2} \cdot \frac{4n}{4n+1}\right)
= \biggl(\frac{3}{2} \cdot \frac{4}{5}\biggr) \biggl(\frac{7}{6} \cdot \frac{8}{9}\biggr) \biggl(\frac{11}{10} \cdot \frac{12}{13}\biggr) \cdots$$

A related result for Gauss's constant ($G=\varpi / \pi$) is:

$$\frac{\varpi}{\pi} = \prod_{n=1}^{\infty} \left(\frac{4n-1}{4n} \cdot \frac{4n+2}{4n+1}\right)
= \biggl(\frac{3}{4} \cdot \frac{6}{5}\biggr) \biggl(\frac{7}{8} \cdot \frac{10}{9}\biggr) \biggl(\frac{11}{12} \cdot \frac{14}{13}\biggr) \cdots$$

An infinite series discovered by Gauss is:

$$\frac{\varpi}{\pi} = \sum_{n=0}^\infty (-1)^n \prod_{k=1}^n \frac{(2k-1)^2}{(2k)^2}
= 1 - \frac{1^2}{2^2} + \frac{1^2\cdot3^2}{2^2\cdot4^2} - \frac{1^2\cdot3^2\cdot5^2}{2^2\cdot4^2\cdot6^2} + \cdots$$

The Machin formula for π is $\tfrac14\pi = 4 \arctan \tfrac15 - \arctan \tfrac1{239},$ and several similar formulas for π can be developed using trigonometric angle sum identities, e.g. Euler's formula $\tfrac14\pi = \arctan\tfrac12 + \arctan\tfrac13$. Analogous formulas can be developed for ϖ, including the following found by Gauss: $\tfrac12\varpi = 2 \operatorname{arcsl} \tfrac12 + \operatorname{arcsl} \tfrac7{23}$, where $\operatorname{arcsl}$ is the lemniscate arcsine.

The lemniscate constant can be rapidly computed by the series

$$\varpi=2^{-1/2}\pi\biggl(\sum_{n\in\mathbb{Z}}e^{-\pi n^2}\biggr)^2=2^{1/4}\pi e^{-\pi/12} \biggl(\sum_{n\in\mathbb{Z}}(-1)^n e^{-\pi p_n}\biggr)^2$$

where $p_n=\tfrac12(3n^2-n)$ (these are the generalized pentagonal numbers). Also

$$\sum_{m,n\in\mathbb{Z}}e^{-2\pi (m^2 +mn+n^2)}=\sqrt{1+\sqrt{3}}\dfrac{\varpi}{12^{1/8}\pi}.$$

In a spirit similar to that of the Basel problem,

$$\sum_{z\in\mathbb{Z}[i]\setminus\{0\}}\frac{1}{z^4}=G_4(i)=\frac{\varpi ^4}{15}$$

where $\mathbb{Z}[i]$ are the Gaussian integers and $G_4$ is the Eisenstein series of weight $4$ (see Lemniscate elliptic functions § Hurwitz numbers for a more general result).

A related result is

$$\sum_{n=1}^\infty \sigma_3(n)e^{-2\pi n}=\frac{\varpi^4}{80 \pi^4}-\frac{1}{240}$$

where $\sigma_3$ is the sum of positive divisors function.

In 1842, Malmsten found

$$\beta'(1)=\sum_{n=1}^\infty (-1)^{n+1}\frac{\log (2n+1)}{2n+1}=\frac{\pi}{4}\left(\gamma+2\log\frac{\pi}{\varpi\sqrt{2}}\right)$$

where $\gamma$ is Euler's constant and $\beta(s)$ is the Dirichlet-Beta function.

The lemniscate constant is given by the rapidly converging series

$$\varpi = \pi\sqrt[4]{32}e^{-\frac{\pi}{3}}\biggl(\sum_{n = -\infty}^\infty (-1)^n e^{-2n\pi(3n+1)} \biggr)^2.$$

The constant is also given by the infinite product

$$\varpi = \pi\prod_{m = 1}^\infty \tanh^2 \left( \frac{\pi m}{2}\right).$$

Also

$$\sum_{n=0}^\infty \frac{(-1)^n}{6635520^n}\frac{(4n)!}{n!^4}=\frac{24}{5^{7/4}}\frac{\varpi^2}{\pi^2}.$$

== Continued fractions ==
A (generalized) continued fraction for π is
$$\frac\pi2=1 + \cfrac{1}{1 + \cfrac{1\cdot 2}{1 + \cfrac{2\cdot 3}{1 + \cfrac{3\cdot 4}{1+\ddots}}}}$$
An analogous formula for ϖ is
$$\frac\varpi2= 1 + \cfrac{1}{2 + \cfrac{2\cdot 3}{2 + \cfrac{4\cdot 5}{2 + \cfrac{6\cdot 7}{2+\ddots}}}}$$

Define Brouncker's continued fraction by
$$b(s)=s + \cfrac{1^2}{2s + \cfrac{3^2}{2s + \cfrac{5^2}{2s+\ddots}}},\quad s>0.$$
Let $n\ge 0$ except for the first equality where $n\ge 1$. Then
$$\begin{align}b(4n)&=(4n+1)\prod_{k=1}^n \frac{(4k-1)^2}{(4k-3)(4k+1)}\frac{\pi}{\varpi^2}\\
b(4n+1)&=(2n+1)\prod_{k=1}^n \frac{(2k)^2}{(2k-1)(2k+1)}\frac{4}{\pi}\\
b(4n+2)&=(4n+1)\prod_{k=1}^n \frac{(4k-3)(4k+1)}{(4k-1)^2}\frac{\varpi^2}{\pi}\\
b(4n+3)&=(2n+1)\prod_{k=1}^n \frac{(2k-1)(2k+1)}{(2k)^2}\,\pi.\end{align}$$
For example,
$$\begin{align}
b(1) &= \frac{4}{\pi}, &
b(2) &= \frac{\varpi^2}{\pi}, &
b(3) &= \pi, &
b(4) &= \frac{9\pi}{\varpi^2}.
\end{align}$$

In fact, the values of $b(1)$ and $b(2)$, coupled with the functional equation
$$b(s+2)=\frac{(s+1)^2}{b(s)},$$
determine the values of $b(n)$ for all $n$.

=== Simple continued fractions ===
Simple continued fractions for the lemniscate constant and related constants include
$$\begin{align}
\varpi           &= [2,1,1,1,1,1,4,1,2,\ldots], \\[8mu]
2\varpi          &= [5,4,10,2,1,2,3,29,\ldots], \\[5mu]
\frac{\varpi}{2} &= [1,3,4,1,1,1,5,2,\ldots], \\[2mu]
\frac{\varpi}{\pi} &= [0,1,5,21,3,4,14,\ldots].
\end{align}$$

== Integrals ==
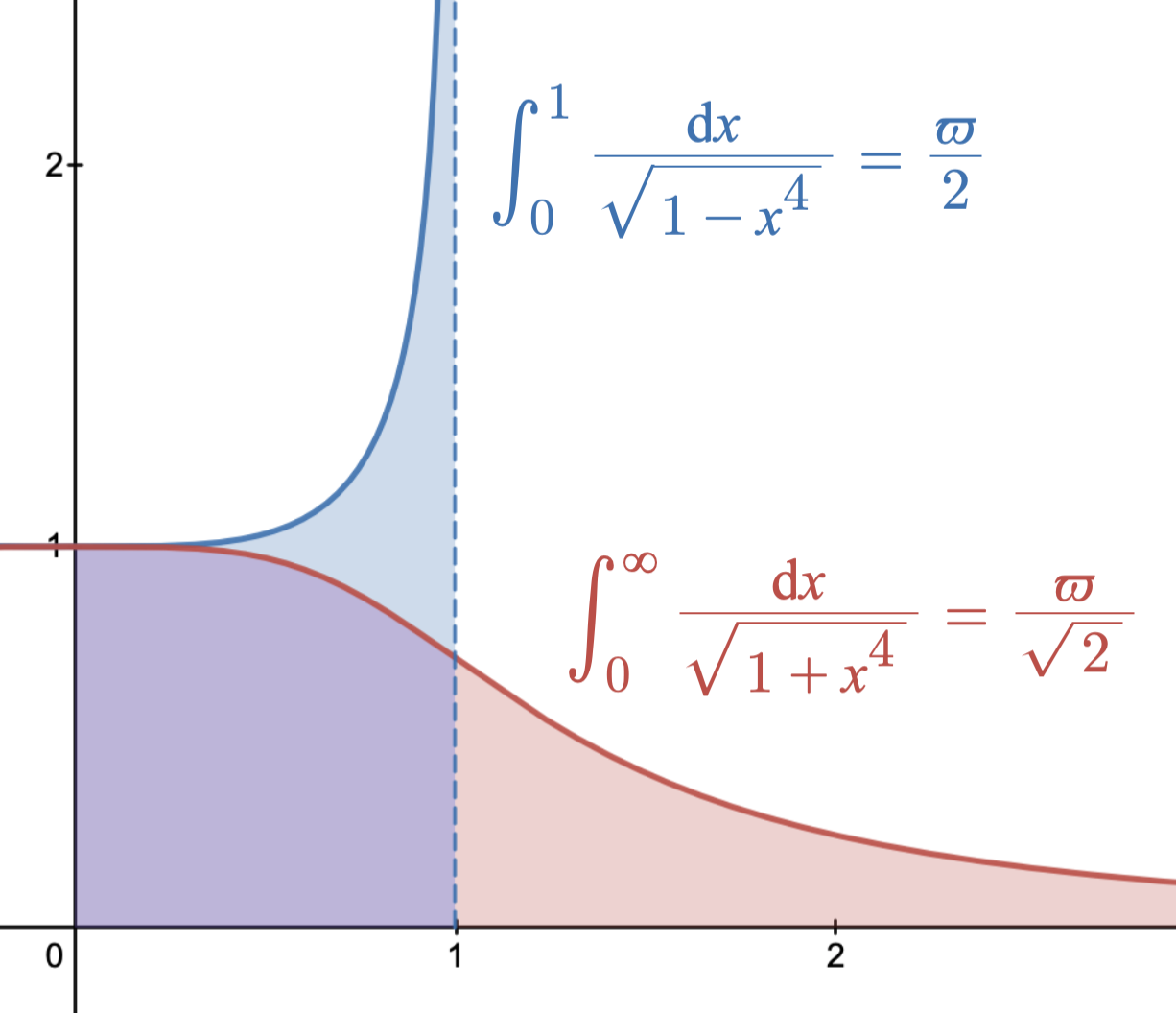
A geometric representation of $\varpi/2$ and $\varpi/\sqrt{2}$

The lemniscate constant ϖ is related to the area under the curve $x^4 + y^4 = 1$. Defining $\pi_n \mathrel{:=} \Beta\bigl(\tfrac1n, \tfrac1n \bigr)$, twice the area in the positive quadrant under the curve $x^n + y^n = 1$ is $2 \int_0^1 \sqrt[n]{1 - x^n}\mathop{\mathrm{d}x} = \tfrac1n \pi_n.$ In the quartic case, $\tfrac14 \pi_4 = \tfrac1\sqrt{2} \varpi.$

In 1842, Malmsten discovered that

$$\int_0^1 \frac{\log (-\log x)}{1+x^2}\, dx=\frac{\pi}{2}\log\frac{\pi}{\varpi\sqrt{2}}.$$

Furthermore,
$$\int_0^\infty \frac{\tanh x}{x}e^{-x}\, dx=\log\frac{\varpi^2}{\pi}$$

and

$$\int_0^\infty e^{-x^4}\, dx=\frac{\sqrt{2\varpi\sqrt{2\pi}}}{4},\quad\text{analogous to}\,\int_0^\infty e^{-x^2}\, dx=\frac{\sqrt{\pi}}{2},$$
a form of Gaussian integral.

The lemniscate constant appears in the evaluation of the integrals

$${\frac{\pi}{\varpi}} = \int_0^{\frac{\pi}{2}}\sqrt{\sin(x)}\,dx=\int_0^{\frac{\pi}{2}}\sqrt{\cos(x)}\,dx$$

$$\frac{\varpi}{\pi} = \int_0^{\infty}{\frac{dx}{\sqrt{\cosh(\pi x)}}}$$

John Todd's lemniscate constants are defined by integrals:

$$A = \int_0^1\frac{dx}{\sqrt{1 - x^4}}$$

$$B = \int_0^1\frac{x^2\, dx}{\sqrt{1 - x^4}}$$

=== Circumference of an ellipse ===
The lemniscate constant satisfies the equation

$$\frac{\pi}{\varpi} = 2 \int_0^1\frac{x^2\, dx}{\sqrt{1 - x^4}}$$

Euler discovered in 1738 that for the rectangular elastica (first and second lemniscate constants)

$$\textrm{arc}\ \textrm{length}\cdot\textrm{height} = A \cdot B = \int_0^1 \frac{\mathrm{d}x}{\sqrt{1 - x^4}} \cdot \int_0^1 \frac{x^2 \mathop{\mathrm{d}x}}{\sqrt{1 - x^4}} = \frac\varpi2 \cdot \frac\pi{2\varpi} = \frac\pi4$$

Now considering the circumference $C$ of the ellipse with axes $\sqrt{2}$ and $1$, satisfying $2x^2 + 4y^2 = 1$, Stirling noted that

$$\frac{C}{2} = \int_0^1\frac{dx}{\sqrt{1 - x^4}} + \int_0^1\frac{x^2\,dx}{\sqrt{1 - x^4}}$$

Hence the full circumference is

$$C = \frac{\pi}{\varpi} + \varpi =3.820197789\ldots$$

This is also the arc length of the sine curve on half a period:

$$C = \int_0^\pi \sqrt{1+\cos^2(x)}\,dx$$

== Other limits ==
Analogously to
$$2\pi=\lim_{n\to\infty}\left|\frac{(2n)!}{\mathrm{B}_{2n}}\right|^{\frac{1}{2n}}$$
where $\mathrm{B}_n$ are Bernoulli numbers, we have
$$2\varpi=\lim_{n\to\infty}\left(\frac{(4n)!}{\mathrm{H}_{4n}}\right)^{\frac{1}{4n}}$$
where $\mathrm{H}_n$ are Hurwitz numbers.
