= Baker's theorem =

On algebraic independence of logarithms

In transcendental number theory, a mathematical discipline, Baker's theorem gives a lower bound for the absolute value of linear combinations of logarithms of algebraic numbers. Nearly fifteen years earlier, Alexander Gelfond had considered the problem with only integer coefficients to be of "extraordinarily great significance". The result, proved by Alan Baker (1966, 1967a, 1967b), subsumed many earlier results in transcendental number theory. Baker used this to prove the transcendence of many numbers, to derive effective bounds for the solutions of some Diophantine equations, and to solve the class number problem of finding all imaginary quadratic fields with class number 1.

== History ==
To simplify notation, let $\mathbb{L}$ be the set of logarithms to the base e of nonzero algebraic numbers, that is
$$\mathbb{L} = \left \{\lambda \in \Complex : \ e^\lambda \in \overline{\Q} \right \},$$
where $\Complex$ denotes the set of complex numbers and $\overline{\Q}$ denotes the algebraic numbers (the algebraic closure of the rational numbers $\Q$). Using this notation, several results in transcendental number theory become much easier to state. For example, the Hermite–Lindemann theorem becomes the statement that any nonzero element of $\mathbb{L}$ is transcendental.

In 1934, Alexander Gelfond and Theodor Schneider independently proved the Gelfond–Schneider theorem. This result is usually stated as: if $a$ is algebraic and not equal to 0 or 1, and if $b$ is algebraic and irrational, then $a^b$ is transcendental. The exponential function is multi-valued for complex exponents, and this applies to all of its values, which in most cases constitute infinitely many numbers. Equivalently, though, it says that if $\lambda_1, \lambda_2 \in \mathbb{L}$ are linearly independent over the rational numbers, then they are linearly independent over the algebraic numbers. So if $\lambda_1, \lambda_2 \in \mathbb{L}$ and $\lambda_2$ is not zero, then the quotient $\lambda_1/\lambda_2$ is either a rational number or transcendental. It cannot be an algebraic irrational number like $\sqrt2$.

Although proving this result of "rational linear independence implies algebraic linear independence" for two elements of $\mathbb{L}$ was sufficient for his and Schneider's result, Gelfond felt that it was crucial to extend this result to arbitrarily many elements of $\mathbb{L}.$ Indeed, from Gel'fond (1960, p. 177):

...one may assume ... that the most pressing problem in the theory of transcendental numbers is the investigation of the measures of transcendence of finite sets of logarithms of algebraic numbers.

This problem was solved fourteen years later by Alan Baker and has since had numerous applications not only to transcendence theory but in algebraic number theory and the study of Diophantine equations as well. Baker received the Fields Medal in 1970 for both this work and his applications of it to Diophantine equations.

== Statement ==
With the above notation, Baker's theorem is a nonhomogeneous generalization of the Gelfond–Schneider theorem. Specifically it states:

Baker's Theorem—If $\lambda_1, \ldots, \lambda_n \in \mathbb{L}$ are linearly independent over the rational numbers, then for any algebraic numbers $\beta_0, \ldots, \beta_n,$ not all zero, we have
$$\left|\beta_0+\beta_1\lambda_1+\cdots+\beta_n \lambda_n\right| > H^{-C}$$
where H is the maximum of the heights of $\beta_i$ and C is an effectively computable number depending on n, $\lambda_i$ and the maximum d of the degrees of $\beta_i.$ (If β_{0} is nonzero then the assumption that $\lambda_i$ are linearly independent can be dropped.) In particular this number is nonzero, so 1 and $\lambda_i$ are linearly independent over the algebraic numbers.

Just as the Gelfond–Schneider theorem is equivalent to the statement about the transcendence of numbers of the form a^{b}, so too Baker's theorem implies the transcendence of numbers of the form

$$a_1^{b_1}\cdots a_n^{b_n},$$

where the b_{i} are all algebraic, irrational, and 1, b_{1}, ..., b_{n} are linearly independent over the rationals, and the a_{i} are all algebraic and not 0 or 1.

Baker (1977) also gave several versions with explicit constants. For example, if $\exp(\lambda_j) = \alpha_j$ has height at most $A_j \ge 4$ and all the numbers $\beta_j$ have height at most $B \ge 4$ then the linear form

$$\Lambda=\beta_0+\beta_1\lambda_1+\cdots+\beta_n\lambda_n$$

is either 0 or satisfies

$$\log|\Lambda|>(16nd)^{200n}\Omega \left (\log\Omega-\log\log A_n \right ) (\log B+\log\Omega)$$

where

$$\Omega=\log A_1 \log A_2 \cdots \log A_n$$

and the field generated by $\alpha_i$ and $\beta_i$ over the rationals has degree at most d. In the special case when β_{0} = 0 and all the $\beta_j$ are rational integers, the rightmost term log Ω can be deleted.

An explicit result by Baker and Wüstholz for a linear form Λ with integer coefficients yields a lower bound of the form

$$\log|\Lambda| >-C h(\alpha_1)h(\alpha_2)\cdots h(\alpha_n) \log \left (\max \left \{|\beta_1|, \ldots, |\beta_n| \right \} \right ),$$

where

$$C = 18(n + 1)! n^{n+1} (32d)^{n+2}\log(2nd),$$

and d is the degree of the number field generated by the $\alpha_i.$

== Baker's method ==
Baker's proof of his theorem is an extension of the argument given by Gel'fond (1960, chapter III, section 4). The main ideas of the proof are illustrated by the proof of the following qualitative version of the theorem of Baker (1966) described by Serre (1971):

If the numbers $2\pi i, \log a_1, \ldots, \log a_n$ are linearly independent over the rational numbers, for nonzero algebraic numbers $a_1, \ldots, a_n,$ then they are linearly independent over the algebraic numbers.

The precise quantitative version of Baker's theory can be proved by replacing the conditions that things are zero by conditions that things are sufficiently small throughout the proof.

The main idea of Baker's proof is to construct an auxiliary function $\Phi(z_1,\ldots,z_{n-1})$ of several variables that vanishes to high order at many points of the form $z_1 = \cdots = z_{n-1} = l,$ then repeatedly show that it vanishes to lower order at even more points of this form. Finally the fact that it vanishes (to order 1) at enough points of this form implies using Vandermonde determinants that there is a multiplicative relation between the numbers a_{i}.

=== Construction of the auxiliary function ===
Assume there is a relation

$$\beta_1\log \alpha_1+\cdots+\beta_{n-1}\log\alpha_{n-1}=\log \alpha_n$$

for algebraic numbers α_{1}, ..., α_{n}, β_{1}, ..., β_{n−1}. The function Φ is of the form

$$\Phi(z_1,\ldots,z_{n-1}) = \sum_{\lambda_1=0}^L\cdots \sum_{\lambda_n=0}^L p(\lambda_1, \ldots,\lambda_n) \alpha_1^{(\lambda_1+\lambda_n\beta_1)z_1} \cdots \alpha_{n-1}^{(\lambda_{n-1}+\lambda_n\beta_{n-1})z_{n-1}}$$

The integer coefficients p are chosen so that they are not all zero and Φ and its derivatives of order at most some constant M vanish at $z_1 = \cdots = z_{n-1} = l,$ for integers $l$ with $0 \leq l \leq h$ for some constant h. This is possible because these conditions are homogeneous linear equations in the coefficients p, which have a non-zero solution provided the number of unknown variables p is larger than the number of equations. The linear relation between the logs of the α's is needed to cut down the number of linear equations that have to be satisfied. Moreover, using Siegel's lemma, the sizes of the coefficients p can be chosen to be not too large. The constants L, h, and M have to be carefully adjusted so that the next part of the proof works, and are subject to some constraints, which are roughly:

- L must be somewhat smaller than M to make the argument about extra zeros below work.
- A small power of h must be larger than L to make the final step of the proof work.
- L^{n} must be larger than about M^{n−1}h in order that it is possible to solve for the coefficients p.

The constraints can be satisfied by taking h to be sufficiently large, M to be some fixed power of h, and L to be a slightly smaller power of h. Baker took M to be about h^{2} and L to be about h^{2−1/2n}.

The linear relation between the logarithms of the α's is used to reduce L slightly; roughly speaking, without it the condition L^{n} must be larger than about M^{n−1}h would become L^{n} must be larger than about M^{n}h, which is incompatible with the condition that L is somewhat smaller than M.

=== Zeros of the auxiliary function ===
The next step is to show that Φ vanishes to slightly smaller order at many more points of the form $z_1 = \cdots = z_{n-1} = l$ for integers l. This idea was Baker's key innovation: previous work on this problem involved trying to increase the number of derivatives that vanish while keeping the number of points fixed, which does not seem to work in the multivariable case. This is done by combining two ideas; First one shows that the derivatives at these points are quite small, by using the fact that many derivatives of Φ vanish at many nearby points. Then one shows that derivatives of Φ at this point are given by algebraic integers times known constants. If an algebraic integer has all its conjugates bounded by a known constant, then it cannot be too small unless it is zero, because the product of all conjugates of a nonzero algebraic integer is at least 1 in absolute value. Combining these two ideas implies that Φ vanishes to slightly smaller order at many more points $z_1 = \cdots = z_{n-1} = l.$ This part of the argument requires that Φ does not increase too rapidly; the growth of Φ depends on the size of L, so requires a bound on the size of L, which turns out to be roughly that L must be somewhat smaller than M. More precisely, Baker showed that since Φ vanishes to order M at h consecutive integers, it also vanishes to order M/2 at h^{1+1/8n} consecutive integers 1, 2, 3, .... Repeating this argument J times shows that Φ vanishes to order M/2^{J} at h^{1+J/8n} points, provided that h is sufficiently large and L is somewhat smaller than M/2^{J}.

One then takes J large enough that:

$$h^{1 +\frac{J}{8n}} > (L+1)^n.$$

(J larger than about 16n will do if h^{2} > L) so that:

$$\forall l \in \left \{1, 2, \ldots, (L+1)^n \right \}: \qquad \Phi(l, \ldots, l ) = 0.$$

=== Completion of the proof ===
By definition $\Phi(l, \ldots, l) =0$ can be written as:

$$\sum_{\lambda_1=0}^L \cdots \sum_{\lambda_n=0}^L p(\lambda_1,\ldots,\lambda_n) \alpha_1^{\lambda_1 l} \cdots \alpha_n^{\lambda_n l} = 0.$$

Therefore, as l varies we have a system of (L + 1)^{n} homogeneous linear equations in the (L + 1)^{n} unknowns which by assumption has a non-zero solution, which in turn implies the determinant of the matrix of coefficients must vanish. However this matrix is a Vandermonde matrix and the formula for the determinant of such a matrix forces an equality between two of the values:

$$\alpha_1^{\lambda_1} \cdots \alpha_n^{\lambda_n}$$

so $\alpha_1, \ldots, \alpha_n$ are multiplicatively dependent. Taking logs shows that $2\pi i, \log \alpha_1, \ldots, \log \alpha_n$ are linearly dependent over the rationals.

=== Extensions and generalizations ===
Baker (1966) in fact gave a quantitative version of the theorem, giving effective lower bounds for the linear form in logarithms. This is done by a similar argument, except statements about something being zero are replaced by statements giving a small upper bound for it, and so on.

Baker (1967a) showed how to eliminate the assumption about 2πi in the theorem. This requires a modification of the final step of the proof. One shows that many derivatives of the function $\phi(z) = \Phi(z, \ldots, z)$ vanish at z = 0, by an argument similar to the one above. But these equations for the first (L+1)^{n} derivatives again give a homogeneous set of linear equations for the coefficients p, so the determinant is zero, and is again a Vandermonde determinant, this time for the numbers λ_{1} log α_{1} + ⋯ + λ_{n} log α_{n}. So two of these expressions must be the same which shows that log α_{1},...,log α_{n} are linearly dependent over the rationals.

Baker (1967b) gave an inhomogeneous version of the theorem, showing that

$$\beta_0 + \beta_1\log \alpha_1+\cdots+\beta_{n}\log\alpha_{n}$$

is nonzero for nonzero algebraic numbers β_{0}, ..., β_{n}, α_{1}, ..., α_{n}, and moreover giving an effective lower bound for it. The proof is similar to the homogeneous case: one can assume that

$$\beta_0+\beta_1\log \alpha_1+\cdots+\beta_{n-1}\log\alpha_{n-1}=\log \alpha_n$$

and one inserts an extra variable z_{0} into Φ as follows:

$$\Phi(z_0,\ldots,z_{n-1}) = \sum_{\lambda_0=0}^L \cdots \sum_{\lambda_n=0}^L p(\lambda_0, \ldots,\lambda_n) z_0^{\lambda_0} e^{\lambda_n\beta_0z_0} \alpha_1^{(\lambda_1+\lambda_n\beta_1)z_1}\cdots\alpha_{n-1}^{(\lambda_{n-1}+\lambda_n\beta_{n-1})z_{n-1}}$$

== Corollaries ==
As mentioned above, the theorem includes numerous earlier transcendence results concerning the exponential function, such as the Hermite–Lindemann theorem and Gelfond–Schneider theorem. It is not quite as encompassing as the still unproven Schanuel's conjecture, and does not imply the six exponentials theorem nor, clearly, the still open four exponentials conjecture.

The main reason Gelfond desired an extension of his result was not just for a slew of new transcendental numbers. In 1935 he used the tools he had developed to prove the Gelfond–Schneider theorem to derive a lower bound for the quantity

$$|\beta_1\lambda_1+\beta_2\lambda_2|$$

where β_{1} and β_{2} are algebraic and λ_{1} and λ_{2} are in $\mathbb{L}$. Baker's proof gave lower bounds for quantities like the above but with arbitrarily many terms, and he could use these bounds to develop effective means of tackling Diophantine equations and to solve Gauss' class number problem.

== Extensions ==
Baker's theorem grants us the linear independence over the algebraic numbers of logarithms of algebraic numbers. This is weaker than proving their algebraic independence. So far no progress has been made on this problem at all. It has been conjectured that if λ_{1}, ..., λ_{n} are elements of $\mathbb{L}$ that are linearly independent over the rational numbers, then they are algebraically independent too. This is a special case of Schanuel's conjecture, but so far it remains to be proved that there even exist two algebraic numbers whose logarithms are algebraically independent. Indeed, Baker's theorem rules out linear relations between logarithms of algebraic numbers unless there are trivial reasons for them; the next most simple case, that of ruling out homogeneous quadratic relations, is the still open four exponentials conjecture.

Similarly, extending the result to algebraic independence but in the p-adic setting, and using the p-adic logarithm function, remains an open problem. It is known that proving algebraic independence of linearly independent p-adic logarithms of algebraic p-adic numbers would prove Leopoldt's conjecture on the p-adic ranks of units of a number field.

== See also ==
- Analytic subgroup theorem
