= Gelfond's constant =

Constant e raised to the power of pi

In mathematics, the exponential of pi e^{π}, also called Gelfond's constant, is the real number e raised to the power π (i.e., the value of the exponential function at π).

Its decimal expansion is given by

e^{π} = 23.14069263277926900572... (sequence A039661 in the OEIS).

Like both e and π, this constant is both irrational and transcendental. This follows from the Gelfond–Schneider theorem, which establishes a^{b} to be transcendental, given that a is algebraic and not equal to zero or one and b is algebraic but not rational. We have
$$e^\pi = (e^{i\pi})^{-i} = (-1)^{-i},$$
where i is the imaginary unit. Since −i is algebraic but not rational, e^{π} is transcendental. The numbers π, e^{π}, and the lemniscate constant are also known to be algebraically independent over the rational numbers, as demonstrated by Yuri Nesterenko. It is not known whether e^{π} is a Liouville number. The constant was mentioned in Hilbert's seventh problem alongside the Gelfond–Schneider constant 2^{√2}, and the name "Gelfond's constant" stems from Soviet mathematician Alexander Gelfond.

== Occurrences ==
The constant e^{π} appears in relation to the volumes of hyperspheres.

Graphs of volumes ($V_n$) and surface areas ($S_{n-1}$) of n-balls of radius 1

The volume of an n-sphere with radius R is given by
$$V_n(R) = \frac{\pi^\frac{n}{2}R^n}{\Gamma\left(\frac{n}{2} + 1\right)},$$
where Γ is the gamma function. Considering only unit spheres (R = 1) yields
$$V_n(1) = \frac{\pi^\frac{n}{2}}{\Gamma\left(\frac{n}{2} + 1\right)},$$

Any even-dimensional 2n-sphere now gives
$$V_{2n}(1) = \frac{\pi^n}{\Gamma(n + 1)} = \frac{\pi^n}{n!}.$$
Summing up all even-dimensional unit sphere volumes and utilizing the series expansion of the exponential function gives
$$\sum_{n=0}^\infty V_{2n}(1) = \sum_{n=0}^\infty \frac{\pi^n}{n!} = \exp(\pi) = e^\pi.$$

Also, if one defines k_{0} = 1/√2 and
$$k_{n+1} = \frac{1 - \sqrt{1 - k_n^2}}{1 + \sqrt{1 - k_n^2}}$$
for n > 0, then the sequence
$$(4/k_{n+1})^{2^{-n}}$$
converges rapidly to e^{π}.

=== In physics ===
The Q factor is a measure of how underdamped an oscillating system is; at large values, it is approximately equal to the number of oscillation cycles it takes for the amplitude of the oscillator to decrease by a factor of e^{π}, or the energy by a factor of e^{2π}.

In a water wave, water molecules near the surface move in a circular motion as the wave propagates, attenuating exponentially with depth. At the characteristic length scale equal to 1/2 the wavelength, known as the wave base, the circular motion is attenuated by a factor of approximately e^{π} relative to the surface and is negligible at lower depths. The circular motion leaves characteristic ripples in coastal seabeds shallower than the typical wave base.

A black hole bends light coming from behind it, producing an infinite series of lensed images corresponding to the number of times light wraps around the photon sphere. For a non-rotating black hole, the ratio of distances between successive images is asymptotically equal to e^{−2π}.

Blumhofer and Hutter (1997) describe a toy model of a quantum field theory with a Gribov ambiguity-like mechanism that produces multiple generations of fermions, analogous to the real generations in the Standard Model. In the typical case, the mass ratio between successive generations is approximately e^{π}.

== Similar or related constants ==
=== Ramanujan's constant ===
The number e^{π√163} is known as Ramanujan's constant. Its decimal expansion is given by

e^{π√163} = 262537412640768743.99999999999925007259... (sequence A060295 in the OEIS),

which turns out to be very close to the integer 640320^{3} + 744. This is an application of Heegner numbers, where 163 is the Heegner number in question. This number was discovered in 1859 by the mathematician Charles Hermite. In a 1975 April Fool article in Scientific American magazine, "Mathematical Games" columnist Martin Gardner made the hoax claim that the number was in fact an integer, and that the Indian mathematical genius Srinivasa Ramanujan had predicted it—hence its name. Ramanujan's constant is also a transcendental number.

The coincidental closeness, to within one trillionth of the number 640320^{3} + 744 is explained by complex multiplication and the q-expansion of the j-invariant, specifically:
$$j\big((1 + \sqrt{-163})/2\big) = (-640\,320)^3$$
and
$$(-640\,320)^3 = -e^{\pi \sqrt{163}} + 744 + O\left(e^{-\pi \sqrt{163}}\right),$$
where the error term
$$O\left(e^{-\pi {\sqrt {163}}}\right) = -196\,884/e^{\pi \sqrt{163}} \approx -196\,884/(640\,320^3 + 744) \approx -0.000\,000\,000\,000\,75,$$
which explains why e^{π√163} is 0.00000000000075 below 640320^{3} + 744.

For more detail on this proof, consult the article on Heegner numbers.

=== The number e^{π} − π ===
The number e^{π} − π is also very close to an integer, its decimal expansion being given by

e^{π} − π = 19.99909997918947576726... (sequence A018938 in the OEIS).

The explanation for this seemingly remarkable coincidence was given by A. Doman in September 2023 and is a result of a sum related to Jacobi theta functions as follows:
$$\sum_{k=1}^\infty (8\pi k^2 - 2) e^{-\pi k^2} = 1.$$
The first term dominates, since the sum of the terms for $k \geq 2$ total $\sim 0.0003436.$ The sum can therefore be truncated to $(8\pi - 2) e^{-\pi} \approx 1,$ where solving for $e^\pi$ gives $e^\pi \approx 8\pi - 2.$ Rewriting the approximation for $e^\pi$ and using the approximation for $7\pi \approx 22$ gives
$$e^\pi \approx \pi + 7\pi - 2 \approx \pi + 22 - 2 = \pi + 20.$$
Thus, rearranging terms gives $e^\pi - \pi \approx 20.$ Ironically, the crude approximation for $7\pi$ yields an additional order of magnitude of precision.

=== The number π^{e} ===
The decimal expansion of π^{e} is given by

$\pi^e =$ 22.45915771836104547342... (sequence A059850 in the OEIS).

It is not known whether or not this number is transcendental. Note that, by Gelfond–Schneider theorem, we can only infer definitively whether or not a^{b} is transcendental if a and b are algebraic (a and b are both considered complex numbers).

In the case of e^{π}, we are only able to prove this number transcendental due to properties of complex exponential forms and the above equivalency given to transform it into (−1)^{−i}, allowing the application of Gelfond–Schneider theorem.

π^{e} has no such equivalence, and hence, as both π and e are transcendental, we cannot use the Gelfond–Schneider theorem to draw conclusions about the transcendence of π^{e}. However the currently unproven Schanuel's conjecture would imply its transcendence.

=== The number i^{i} ===
Using the principal value of the complex logarithm,
$$i^i = (e^{i\pi/2})^i = e^{-\pi/2} = (e^\pi)^{-1/2}.$$
The decimal expansion of is given by

$i^i =$ 0.20787957635076190854... (sequence A049006 in the OEIS).

Its transcendence follows directly from the transcendence of e^{π} and directly from the Gelfond–Schneider theorem.

== See also ==
- Transcendental number
- Transcendental number theory, the study of questions related to transcendental numbers
- Euler's identity
- Gelfond–Schneider constant
