= Transcendental number =

In mathematics, a non-algebraic number

In mathematics, a transcendental number is a real or complex number that is not algebraic: that is, not the root of a non-zero polynomial with integer (or, equivalently, rational) coefficients. The best-known transcendental numbers are π and e. The quality of a number being transcendental is called transcendence.

Only a few classes of transcendental numbers are known, because it can be difficult to show that a number is transcendental, but transcendental numbers are not rare. Indeed, almost all real and complex numbers are transcendental, since the algebraic numbers are countable, while the real numbers $\R$ and complex numbers $\C$ are both uncountable, and therefore larger than any countable set.

All transcendental real numbers (also known as real transcendental numbers or transcendental irrational numbers) are irrational, since all rational numbers are algebraic. The converse is not true: Not all irrational numbers are transcendental. Hence, the set of real numbers consists of non-overlapping sets of rational, algebraic irrational, and transcendental real numbers. For example, the square root of 2 is an irrational number, but it is not transcendental as it is a root of the polynomial x^{2} − 2 = 0.

== History ==
The name "transcendental" comes from Latin trānscendere 'to climb over or beyond, surmount', and was first used for the mathematical concept in Leibniz's 1682 paper in which he proved that sin x is not an algebraic function of x. Euler, in the eighteenth century, was probably the first person to define transcendental numbers in the modern sense.

Johann Heinrich Lambert conjectured that e and π were both transcendental numbers in his 1768 paper proving the number π is irrational, and proposed a tentative sketch proof that π is transcendental.

Joseph Liouville first proved the existence of transcendental numbers in 1844, and in 1851 gave the first decimal examples such as the Liouville constant

$$\begin{align}
L_b &= \sum_{n=1}^\infty 10^{-n!} \\[2pt]
&= 10^{-1} + 10^{-2} + 10^{-6} + 10^{-24} + 10^{-120} + 10^{-720} + 10^{-5040} + 10^{-40320} + \ldots \\[4pt]
&= 0.\textbf{1}\textbf{1}000\textbf{1}00000000000000000\textbf{1}000000000000000000000000000\ \ldots
\end{align}$$

in which the nth digit after the decimal point is 1 if n = k! (k factorial) for some k and 0 otherwise. In other words, the nth digit of this number is 1 only if n is one of 1! = 1, 2! = 2, 3! = 6, 4! = 24, etc. Liouville showed that this number belongs to a class of transcendental numbers that can be more closely approximated by rational numbers than can any algebraic irrational number, and this class of numbers is called the Liouville numbers. Liouville showed that all Liouville numbers are transcendental.

The first number to be proven transcendental without having been specifically constructed for the purpose of proving transcendental numbers' existence was e, by Charles Hermite in 1873.

In 1874 Georg Cantor proved that the algebraic numbers are countable and the real numbers are uncountable. He also gave a new method for constructing transcendental numbers. Though this was already implied by his proof of the countability of the algebraic numbers, Cantor also published a construction that proves there are as many transcendental numbers as there are real numbers. (Note: Cantor's construction builds a one-to-one correspondence between the set of transcendental numbers and the set of real numbers. In this article, Cantor only applies his construction to the set of irrational numbers.) Cantor's work established the ubiquity of transcendental numbers.

In 1882 Ferdinand von Lindemann published the first complete proof that π is transcendental. He first proved that e^{a} is transcendental if a is a non-zero algebraic number. Then, since e^{iπ} = −1 is algebraic (see Euler's identity), iπ must be transcendental. But i is algebraic, so π must be transcendental. Karl Weierstrass generalized this approach, to what is now known as the Lindemann–Weierstrass theorem. The transcendence of π means that geometric constructions involving compass and straightedge only cannot produce certain results, such as squaring the circle.

In 1900 David Hilbert posed a question, Hilbert's seventh problem: If a is an algebraic number that is not 0 or 1, and b is an algebraic irrational number, is a^{b} necessarily transcendental? The Gelfond–Schneider theorem (1934) gave the answer (yes). In the 1960s, Alan Baker extended this work in his work on lower bounds for linear forms in any number of logarithms (of algebraic numbers).

== Properties ==
A transcendental number is a (possibly complex) number that is not the root of any integer polynomial. Every real transcendental number must also be irrational, since every rational number is the root of some integer polynomial of degree one. The set of transcendental numbers is uncountably infinite. Since the polynomials with rational coefficients are countable, and since each such polynomial has a finite number of zeroes, the algebraic numbers must also be countable. However, Cantor's diagonal argument proves that the real numbers (and therefore also the complex numbers) are uncountable. Since the real numbers are the union of algebraic and transcendental numbers, it is impossible for both subsets to be countable. This makes the transcendental numbers uncountable.

No rational number is transcendental and all real transcendental numbers are irrational. The irrational numbers contain all the real transcendental numbers and a subset of the algebraic numbers, including the quadratic irrationals and other forms of algebraic irrationals.

Applying any non-constant single-variable algebraic function to a transcendental argument yields a transcendental value. For example, from knowing that π is transcendental, it can be immediately deduced that numbers such as $5\pi$, $\tfrac{\pi - 3}{\sqrt{2}}$, $(\sqrt{\pi}-\sqrt{3})^8$, and $\sqrt[4]{\pi^5+7}$ are transcendental as well.

However, an algebraic function of several variables may yield an algebraic number when applied to transcendental numbers if these numbers are not algebraically independent. For example, π and (1 − π) are both transcendental, but π + (1 − π) = 1 is not. It is unknown whether e + π, for example, is transcendental, though at least one of e + π and eπ must be transcendental. More generally, for any two transcendental numbers a and b, at least one of a + b and ab must be transcendental. To see this, consider the polynomial (x − a)(x − b) = x^{2} − (a + b) x + a b . If (a + b) and a b were both algebraic, then this would be a polynomial with algebraic coefficients. Because algebraic numbers form an algebraically closed field, this would imply that the roots of the polynomial, a and b, must be algebraic. But this is a contradiction, and thus it must be the case that at least one of the coefficients is transcendental.

The non-computable numbers are a strict subset of the transcendental numbers.

All Liouville numbers are transcendental, but not vice versa. Any Liouville number must have unbounded partial quotients in its simple continued fraction expansion. Using a counting argument one can show that there exist transcendental numbers which have bounded partial quotients and hence are not Liouville numbers.

Using the explicit continued fraction expansion of e, one can show that e is not a Liouville number (though the partial quotients in its continued fraction expansion are unbounded). Kurt Mahler showed in 1953 that π is also not a Liouville number. It is conjectured that all infinite continued fractions with bounded terms, that have a "simple" structure, and that are not eventually periodic are transcendental (in other words, algebraic irrational roots of at least third degree polynomials do not have apparent pattern in their continued fraction expansions, since eventually periodic continued fractions correspond to quadratic irrationals, see Hermite's problem).

== Numbers proven to be transcendental ==
Numbers proven to be transcendental:

- π (by the Lindemann–Weierstrass theorem).
- $e^a$ if a is algebraic and nonzero (by the Lindemann–Weierstrass theorem), in particular Euler's number e.
- $e^{\pi \sqrt n}$ where n is a positive integer; in particular Gelfond's constant $e^\pi$ (by the Gelfond–Schneider theorem).
- Algebraic combinations of π and $e^{\pi \sqrt n} , n\in\mathbb Z^{+}$ such as $\pi + e^{\pi}$ and $\pi e^{\pi}$ (following from their algebraic independence).
- $a^b$ where a is algebraic but not 0 or 1, and b is algebraic irrational, in particular the Gelfond–Schneider constant $2^{\sqrt{2}}$ (by the Gelfond–Schneider theorem).
- The natural logarithm ln(a) if a is algebraic and not equal to 0 or 1, for any branch of the logarithm function (by the Lindemann–Weierstrass theorem).
- $\log_b(a)$ if a and b are positive integers not both powers of the same integer, and a is not equal to 1 (by the Gelfond–Schneider theorem).
- All numbers of the form $\pi + \beta_1 \ln (a_1) + \cdots + \beta_n \ln (a_n)$ are transcendental, where $\beta_j$ are algebraic for all $1 \leq j \leq n$ and $a_j$ are non-zero algebraic for all $1 \leq j \leq n$ (by Baker's theorem).
- The trigonometric functions sin(x), cos(x) and their hyperbolic counterparts, for any nonzero algebraic number x, expressed in radians (by the Lindemann–Weierstrass theorem).
- Non-zero results of the inverse trigonometric functions arcsin(x), arccos(x) and their hyperbolic counterparts, for any algebraic number x (by the Lindemann–Weierstrass theorem).
- $\pi^{-1}{\arctan(x)}$, for rational x such that $x \notin \{0,\pm{1}\}$.
- The Dottie number d (the fixed point of the cosine function) – the unique real solution to the equation $\cos(x)=x$, where x is in radians (by the Lindemann–Weierstrass theorem).
- $W(a)$ if a is algebraic and nonzero, for any branch of the Lambert W function (by the Lindemann–Weierstrass theorem), in particular the omega constant Ω.
- $W(r,a)$ if both a and the order r are algebraic such that $a \neq 0$, for any branch of the generalized Lambert W function.
- $\sqrt x _s$, the square super-root of any natural number is either an integer or transcendental (by the Gelfond–Schneider theorem).
- Values of the gamma function of rational numbers that are of the form $\Gamma(n/2),\Gamma(n/3),\Gamma(n/4)$ or $\Gamma(n/6)$.
- Algebraic combinations of π and $\Gamma(1/3)$ or of π and $\Gamma(1/4)$ such as the lemniscate constant $\varpi$ (following from their respective algebraic independences).
- The values of Beta function $\Beta(a,b)$ if $a, b$ and $a+b$ are non-integer rational numbers.
- The Bessel function of the first kind $J_\nu(x)$, its first derivative, and the quotient $\tfrac{J'_\nu (x)}{J_\nu (x)}$ are transcendental when ν is rational and x is algebraic and nonzero, and all nonzero roots of $J_\nu(x)$ and $J'_\nu(x)$ are transcendental when ν is rational.
- The number $\tfrac{\pi}{2} \tfrac{Y_0 (2)}{J_0 (2)} - \gamma$, where $Y_\alpha(x)$ and $J_\alpha(x)$ are Bessel functions and γ is the Euler–Mascheroni constant.
- Values of the Fibonacci zeta function at positive even arguments.
- Any Liouville number, in particular: Liouville's constant $\sum_{k=1}^\infty\frac1{10^{k!}}$.
- Numbers with irrationality measure larger than 2, such as the Champernowne constant $C_{10}$ and Cahen's constant (by Roth's theorem).
- Numbers artificially constructed not to be algebraic periods.
- Any non-computable number, in particular: Chaitin's constant.
- Constructed irrational numbers which are not simply normal in any base.
- Any number for which the digits with respect to some fixed base form a Sturmian word.
- Any irrational number for which the nth digit can be generated by a finite-state machine with b states from the base-b expansion of n.
- Any number for which the simple continued fraction is aperiodic (i.e. a non-quadratic irrational number) and the nth term can be generated by a finite-state machine with b states from the base-b expansion of n.
- The Prouhet–Thue–Morse constant and the related rabbit constant.
- The Komornik–Loreti constant.
- The paperfolding constant (also named as "Gaussian Liouville number").
- The values of the infinite series with fast convergence rate as defined by Y. Gao and J. Gao, such as $\sum_{n=1}^\infty \frac{3^n}{2^{3^n}}$.
- Any number of the form $\sum_{n=0}^\infty \frac{E_n(\beta^{r^n})}{F_n(\beta^{r^n})}$ (where $E_n(z)$, $F_n(z)$ are polynomials in variables $n$ and $z$, $\beta$ is algebraic and $\beta \neq 0$, $r$ is any integer greater than 1).
- Numbers of the form $\sum_{k=0}^\infty 10^{-b^k}$ and $\sum_{k=0}^\infty 10^{-\left\lfloor b^{k} \right\rfloor}$ For b > 1 where $b \mapsto\lfloor b \rfloor$ is the floor function.
- The real number whose digits are built from the decimal digit right before the last non-zero digit of each number in the sequence $N^N$.
- The numbers $\alpha = 3.3003300000...$ and $\alpha^{-1} = 0.3030000030...$ with only two different decimal digits whose nonzero digit positions are given by the Moser–de Bruijn sequence and its double.
- The values of the quasi-modular form at the algebraic points of moduli space $\mathrm{SL}_2(\mathbb Z) /\mathbb H.$
- The values of the Rogers-Ramanujan continued fraction $R(q)$ where ${{q}} \in \mathbb C$ is algebraic and $0 < |q| < 1$. The lemniscatic values of theta function $\sum_{n=-\infty}^\infty q^{n^2}$ (under the same conditions for ${{q}}$) are also transcendental.
- j(q) where ${{q}} \in \mathbb C$ is algebraic but not imaginary quadratic (i.e, the exceptional set of this function is the number field whose degree of extension over $\mathbb Q$ is 2).
- The constants $\epsilon_k$ and $\nu_k$ in the formula for first index of occurrence of Gijswijt's sequence, where k is any integer greater than 1.
- Any hypertranscendental number, a number that is not the value at an algebraic point of a function which is the solution of an algebraic differential equation with coefficients in $\mathbb{Z}[r]$ and with algebraic initial conditions.

== Conjectured transcendental numbers ==
Numbers which have yet to be proven to be either transcendental or algebraic:

- Most nontrivial combinations of two or more transcendental numbers are themselves not known to be transcendental or even irrational: eπ, e + π, π^{π}, e^{e}, π^{e}, π^{√2}, e^{π^{2}}. It has been shown that both e + π and π/e do not satisfy any polynomial equation of degree ≤ 8 and integer coefficients of average size 10^{9}. At least one of the numbers e^{e} and e^{e^{2}} is transcendental. Since the field of algebraic numbers is algebraically closed and e and π are roots of the polynomial x^{2} − (e + π)x + eπ, at least one of the numbers eπ and e + π is transcendental. Schanuel's conjecture would imply that all of the above numbers are transcendental and algebraically independent.
- The Euler–Mascheroni constant γ: In 2010 it has been shown that an infinite list of Euler-Lehmer constants (which includes γ/4) contains at most one algebraic number. In 2012 it was shown that at least one of γ and the Gompertz constant δ is transcendental.
- The values of the Riemann zeta function ζ(n) at odd positive integers $n\geq3$; in particular Apéry's constant ζ(3), which is known to be irrational. For the other numbers ζ(5), ζ(7), ζ(9), ... even this is not known. For any non-negative integer k, at least one of the numbers ζ(4k+3) and $\sum_{n=1}^\infty \frac{1}{n^{4k+3}(e^{2\pi n}-1)}$ is transcendental.
- The values of the Dirichlet beta function β(n) at even positive integers $n\geq2$; in particular Catalan's Constant β(2). (None of them are known to be irrational.)
- The reciprocal Fibonacci constant $\sum_{n=1}^\infty \frac{1}{F_n}$ and related constants (which are all known to be irrational).
- The Mills' constant (which is known to be irrational).
- Values of the Gamma Function Γ(1/n) for positive integers $n=5$ and $n\geq7$ are not known to be irrational, let alone transcendental. For $n\geq2$ at least one the numbers Γ(1/n) and Γ(2/n) is transcendental.

== Proofs for specific numbers ==
=== A proof that e is transcendental ===
The first proof that the base of the natural logarithms, e, is transcendental dates from 1873. We will now follow the strategy of David Hilbert (1862–1943) who gave a simplification of the original proof of Charles Hermite. The idea is the following:

Assume, for purpose of finding a contradiction, that e is algebraic. Then there exists a finite set of integer coefficients c_{0}, c_{1}, ..., c_{n} satisfying the equation:
$$c_{0} + c_{1}e + c_{2} e^{2} + \cdots + c_{n} e^{n} = 0, \qquad c_0, c_n \neq 0 ~.$$
It is difficult to make use of the integer status of these coefficients when multiplied by a power of the irrational e, but we can absorb those powers into an integral which “mostly” will assume integer values. For a positive integer k, define the polynomial
$$f_k(x) = x^{k} \left [(x-1)\cdots(x-n) \right ]^{k+1},$$
and multiply both sides of the above equation by
$$\int^{\infty}_{0} f_k(x) \, e^{-x}\, \mathrm{d}x\ ,$$
to arrive at the equation:
$$c_0 \left (\int^{\infty}_{0} f_k(x) e^{-x} \,\mathrm{d}x \right) +
c_1 e \left( \int^{\infty}_{0} f_k(x) e^{-x} \,\mathrm{d}x \right )
+ \cdots +
c_{n}e^{n} \left( \int^{\infty}_{0} f_k(x) e^{-x} \,\mathrm{d}x \right) = 0 ~.$$

By splitting respective domains of integration, this equation can be written in the form
$$P + Q = 0$$
where
$$\begin{align}
P &= c_{0} \left( \int^{\infty}_{0} f_k(x) e^{-x} \,\mathrm{d}x \right)
+ c_{1} e \left( \int^{\infty}_{1} f_k(x) e^{-x} \,\mathrm{d}x \right)
+ c_{2} e^{2} \left( \int^{\infty}_{2} f_k(x) e^{-x} \,\mathrm{d}x \right)
+ \cdots
+ c_{n} e^{n} \left( \int^{\infty}_{n} f_k(x) e^{-x} \,\mathrm{d}x \right)
\\
Q &= c_{1} e \left(\int^{1}_{0} f_k(x) e^{-x} \,\mathrm{d}x \right)
+ c_{2}e^{2} \left( \int^{2}_{0} f_k(x) e^{-x} \,\mathrm{d}x \right)
+ \cdots+c_{n} e^{n} \left( \int^{n}_{0} f_k(x) e^{-x} \,\mathrm{d}x \right)
\end{align}$$
Here P will turn out to be an integer, but more importantly it grows quickly with k.

==== Lemma 1 ====
There are arbitrarily large k such that $\ \tfrac{P}{k!}\$ is a non-zero integer.

Proof. Recall the standard integral (case of the Gamma function)
$$\int^{\infty}_{0} t^{j} e^{-t} \,\mathrm{d}t = j!$$
valid for any natural number $j$. More generally,

if $g(t) = \sum_{j=0}^m b_j t^j$ then $\int^{\infty}_{0} g(t) e^{-t} \,\mathrm{d}t = \sum_{j=0}^m b_j j!$.

This would allow us to compute $P$ exactly, because any term of $P$ can be rewritten as
$$c_{a} e^{a} \int^{\infty}_{a} f_k(x) e^{-x} \,\mathrm{d}x =
c_{a} \int^{\infty}_{a} f_k(x) e^{-(x-a)} \,\mathrm{d}x =
\left\{ \begin{aligned} t &= x-a \\ x &= t+a \\ \mathrm{d}x &= \mathrm{d}t \end{aligned} \right\} =
c_a \int_0^\infty f_k(t+a) e^{-t} \,\mathrm{d}t$$
through a change of variables. Hence
$$P = \sum_{a=0}^n c_a \int_0^\infty f_k(t+a) e^{-t} \,\mathrm{d}t
= \int_0^\infty \biggl( \sum_{a=0}^n c_a f_k(t+a) \biggr) e^{-t} \,\mathrm{d}t$$
That latter sum is a polynomial in $t$ with integer coefficients, i.e., it is a linear combination of powers $t^j$ with integer coefficients. Hence the number $P$ is a linear combination (with those same integer coefficients) of factorials $j!$; in particular $P$ is an integer.

Smaller factorials divide larger factorials, so the smallest $j!$ occurring in that linear combination will also divide the whole of $P$. We get that $j!$ from the lowest power $t^j$ term appearing with a nonzero coefficient in $\textstyle \sum_{a=0}^n c_a f_k(t+a)$, but this smallest exponent $j$ is also the multiplicity of $t=0$ as a root of this polynomial. $f_k(x)$ is chosen to have multiplicity $k$ of the root $x=0$ and multiplicity $k+1$ of the roots $x=a$ for $a=1,\dots,n$, so that smallest exponent is $t^k$ for $f_k(t)$ and $t^{k+1}$ for $f_k(t+a)$ with $a>0$. Therefore $k!$ divides $P$.

To establish the last claim in the lemma, that $P$ is nonzero, it is sufficient to prove that $k+1$ does not divide $P$. To that end, let $k+1$ be any prime larger than $n$ and $|c_0|$. We know from the above that $(k+1)!$ divides each of $\textstyle c_a \int_0^\infty f_k(t+a) e^{-t} \,\mathrm{d}t$ for $1 \leqslant a \leqslant n$, so in particular all of those are divisible by $k+1$. It comes down to the first term $\textstyle c_0 \int_0^\infty f_k(t) e^{-t} \,\mathrm{d}t$. We have (see falling and rising factorials)
$$f_k(t) = t^k \bigl[ (t-1) \cdots (t-n) \bigr]^{k+1} =
\bigl[ (-1)^{n}(n!) \bigr]^{k+1} t^k + \text{higher degree terms}$$
and those higher degree terms all give rise to factorials $(k+1)!$ or larger. Hence
$$P \equiv
c_0 \int_0^\infty f_k(t) e^{-t} \,\mathrm{d}t \equiv
c_0 \bigl[ (-1)^{n}(n!) \bigr]^{k+1} k! \pmod{(k+1)}$$
That right hand side is a product of nonzero integer factors less than the prime $k+1$, therefore that product is not divisible by $k+1$, and the same holds for $P$; in particular $P$ cannot be zero.

==== Lemma 2 ====
For sufficiently large k, $\left| \tfrac{Q}{k!} \right| <1$.

Proof. Note that

$$\begin{align}
f_k e^{-x} &= x^{k} \left[ (x-1)(x-2) \cdots (x-n) \right]^{k+1} e^{-x}\\
&= \left (x(x-1)\cdots(x-n) \right)^k \cdot \left( (x-1) \cdots (x-n) e^{-x} \right) \\
&= u(x)^k \cdot v(x)
\end{align}$$

where u(x), v(x) are continuous functions of x for all x, so are bounded on the interval [0, n]. That is, there are constants G, H > 0 such that

$$\ \left| f_k e^{-x} \right| \leq |u(x)|^k \cdot |v(x)| < G^k H \quad \text{ for } 0 \leq x \leq n ~.$$

So each of those integrals composing Q is bounded, the worst case being

$$\left| \int_{0}^{n} f_{k} e^{-x}\ \mathrm{d}\ x \right| \leq \int_{0}^{n} \left| f_{k} e^{-x} \right| \ \mathrm{d}\ x \leq \int_{0}^{n}G^k H\ \mathrm{d}\ x = n G^k H ~.$$

It is now possible to bound the sum Q as well:

$$|Q| < G^{k} \cdot n H \left( |c_1|e+|c_2|e^2 + \cdots+|c_n|e^{n} \right) = G^k \cdot M\ ,$$

where M is a constant not depending on k. It follows that

$$\ \left| \frac{Q}{k!} \right| < M \cdot \frac{G^k}{k!} \to 0 \quad \text{ as } k \to \infty\ ,$$

finishing the proof of this lemma.

==== Conclusion ====
Choosing a value of k that satisfies both lemmas leads to a non-zero integer $\left(\tfrac{P}{k!}\right)$ added to a vanishingly small quantity $\left(\tfrac{Q}{k!}\right)$ being equal to zero: an impossibility. It follows that the original assumption, that e can satisfy a polynomial equation with integer coefficients, is also impossible; that is, e is transcendental.

=== The transcendence of π ===
A similar strategy, different from Lindemann's original approach, can be used to show that pi (π) is transcendental. Besides the gamma-function and some estimates as in the proof for e, facts about symmetric polynomials play a vital role in the proof.

For detailed information concerning the proofs of the transcendence of π and e, see the references and external links.

== See also ==
- Transcendental number theory, the study of questions related to transcendental numbers
- Transcendental element, generalization of transcendental numbers in abstract algebra
- Gelfond–Schneider theorem
- Diophantine approximation
- Periods, a countable set of numbers (including all algebraic and some transcendental numbers) which may be defined by integral equations.
- Hartmanis–Stearns conjecture, a conjectural transcendence criterion based on complexity of computing the number's expansion

== Sources ==
- Adamczewski, Boris; Bugeaud, Yann (2005). "On the complexity of algebraic numbers, II. Continued fractions". Acta Mathematica. 195 (1): 1–20. arXiv:math/0511677. Bibcode:2005math.....11677A. doi:10.1007/BF02588048. S2CID 15521751.
- Allouche, J.-P. [in French]; Shallit, J. (2003). Automatic Sequences: Theory, applications, generalizations. Cambridge University Press. ISBN 978-0-521-82332-6. Zbl 1086.11015.
- Baker, A. (1990). Transcendental Number Theory (paperback ed.). Cambridge University Press. ISBN 978-0-521-20461-3. Zbl 0297.10013.
- Blanchard, André; Mendès France, Michel (1982). "Symétrie et transcendance". Bulletin des Sciences Mathématiques. 106 (3): 325–335. MR 0680277.
- Bourbaki, N. (1994). Elements of the History of Mathematics. Springer. ISBN 9783540647676 – via Internet Archive.
- Bugeaud, Yann (2012). Distribution modulo one and Diophantine approximation. Cambridge Tracts in Mathematics. Vol. 193. Cambridge University Press. ISBN 978-0-521-11169-0. Zbl 1260.11001.
- Burger, Edward B.; Tubbs, Robert (2004). Making transcendence transparent. An intuitive approach to classical transcendental number theory. Springer. ISBN 978-0-387-21444-3. Zbl 1092.11031.
- Calude, Cristian S. (2002). Information and Randomness: An algorithmic perspective. Texts in Theoretical Computer Science (2nd rev. and ext. ed.). Springer. ISBN 978-3-540-43466-5. Zbl 1055.68058.
- Cantor, G. (1874). "Über eine Eigenschaft des Inbegriffes aller reelen algebraischen Zahlen". J. Reine Angew. Math. 77: 258–262.
- Cantor, G. (1878). "Ein Beitrag zur Mannigfaltigkeitslehre". J. Reine Angew. Math. 84: 242–258.
- Chudnovsky, G.V. (1984). Contributions to the Theory of Transcendental Numbers. American Mathematical Society. ISBN 978-0-8218-1500-7.
- Davison, J. Les; Shallit, J.O. (1991). "Continued fractions for some alternating series". Monatshefte für Mathematik. 111 (2): 119–126. doi:10.1007/BF01332350. S2CID 120003890.
- Erdős, P.; Dudley, U. (1983). "Some Remarks and Problems in Number Theory Related to the Work of Euler" (PDF). Mathematics Magazine. 56 (5): 292–298. doi:10.2307/2690369. JSTOR 2690369.
- Gelfond, A. (1960) [1956]. Transcendental and Algebraic Numbers (reprint ed.). Dover.
- Gray, Robert (1994). "Georg Cantor and transcendental numbers". Amer. Math. Monthly. 101 (9): 819–832. doi:10.2307/2975129. JSTOR 2975129. Zbl 0827.01004 – via maa.org.
- Hardy, G.H. (1979). An Introduction to the Theory of Numbers (5th ed.). Oxford: Clarendon Press. p. 159. ISBN 0-19-853171-0.
- Higgins, Peter M. (2008). Number Story. Copernicus Books. ISBN 978-1-84800-001-8.
- Hilbert, D. (1893). "Über die Transcendenz der Zahlen e und $\pi$". Mathematische Annalen. 43 (2–3): 216–219. doi:10.1007/BF01443645. S2CID 179177945.
- Kempner, Aubrey J. (1916). "On Transcendental Numbers". Transactions of the American Mathematical Society. 17 (4): 476–482. doi:10.2307/1988833. JSTOR 1988833.
- Lambert, J.H. (1768). "Mémoire sur quelques propriétés remarquables des quantités transcendantes, circulaires et logarithmiques". Mémoires de l'Académie Royale des Sciences de Berlin: 265–322.
- Leibniz, G.W.; Gerhardt, Karl Immanuel; Pertz, Georg Heinrich (1858). Leibnizens mathematische Schriften. Vol. 5. A. Asher & Co. pp. 97–98 – via Internet Archive.
- le Lionnais, F. (1979). Les nombres remarquables. Hermann. ISBN 2-7056-1407-9.
- le Veque, W.J. (2002) [1956]. Topics in Number Theory. Vol. I and II. Dover. ISBN 978-0-486-42539-9 – via Internet Archive.
- Liouville, J. (1851). "Sur des classes très étendues de quantités dont la valeur n'est ni algébrique, ni même réductible à des irrationnelles algébriques" (PDF). J. Math. Pures Appl. 16: 133–142.
- Loxton, J.H. (1988). "13. Automata and transcendence". In Baker, A. (ed.). New Advances in Transcendence Theory. Cambridge University Press. pp. 215–228. ISBN 978-0-521-33545-4. Zbl 0656.10032.
- Mahler, K. (1929). "Arithmetische Eigenschaften der Lösungen einer Klasse von Funktionalgleichungen". Math. Annalen. 101: 342–366. doi:10.1007/bf01454845. JFM 55.0115.01. S2CID 120549929.
- Mahler, K. (1937). "Arithmetische Eigenschaften einer Klasse von Dezimalbrüchen". Proc. Konin. Neder. Akad. Wet. Ser. A (40): 421–428.
- Mahler, K. (1976). Lectures on Transcendental Numbers. Lecture Notes in Mathematics. Vol. 546. Springer. ISBN 978-3-540-07986-6. Zbl 0332.10019.
- Natarajan, Saradha; Thangadurai, Ravindranathan (2020). Pillars of Transcendental Number Theory. Springer Verlag. ISBN 978-981-15-4154-4.
- Pytheas Fogg, N. (2002). Berthé, V.; Ferenczi, Sébastien; Mauduit, Christian; Siegel, A. (eds.). Substitutions in dynamics, arithmetics and combinatorics. Lecture Notes in Mathematics. Vol. 1794. Springer. ISBN 978-3-540-44141-0. Zbl 1014.11015.
- Shallit, J. (15–26 July 1996). "Number theory and formal languages". In Hejhal, D.A.; Friedman, Joel; Gutzwiller, M.C.; Odlyzko, A.M. (eds.). Emerging Applications of Number Theory. IMA Summer Program. The IMA Volumes in Mathematics and its Applications. Vol. 109. Minneapolis, MN: Springer. pp. 547–570. ISBN 978-0-387-98824-5.
