= Auxiliary polynomial =

Auxiliary polynomial is a term in mathematics which may refer to:

- The auxiliary function argument in transcendence theory
- The characteristic polynomial of a recurrence relation
