= Gelfond–Schneider constant =

Two to the power of the square root of two

The Gelfond–Schneider constant or the Hilbert number is two to the power of the square root of two:

$$2^{\sqrt{2}} \approx 2.6651441426902251886502972498731...$$

which was proved to be a transcendental number by Rodion Kuzmin in 1930. In 1934, Aleksandr Gelfond and Theodor Schneider independently proved the more general Gelfond–Schneider theorem, which solved the part of Hilbert's seventh problem described below.

== Properties ==
The square root of the Gelfond–Schneider constant is the transcendental number

$\sqrt{2^{\sqrt{2}}}=\sqrt{2}^{\sqrt{2}} \approx$ 1.63252691943815284477....

This same constant can be used to prove that "an irrational elevated to an irrational power may be rational", even without first proving its transcendence. The proof proceeds as follows: either $\sqrt{2}^\sqrt{2}$ is a rational which proves the theorem, or it is irrational (as it turns out to be) and then

$$\left(\sqrt{2}^{\sqrt{2}}\right)^{\sqrt{2}}=\sqrt{2}^{\sqrt{2}\times\sqrt{2}}=\sqrt{2}^2=2$$

is an irrational to an irrational power that is a rational which proves the theorem. The proof is not constructive, as it does not say which of the two cases is true, but it is much simpler than Kuzmin's proof.

== Hilbert's seventh problem ==
Part of the seventh of Hilbert's twenty-three problems posed in 1900 was to prove, or find a counterexample to, the claim that a^{b} is always transcendental for algebraic a ≠ 0, 1 and irrational algebraic b. In the address he gave two explicit examples, one of them being the Gelfond–Schneider constant 2^{√2}.

In 1919, he gave a lecture on number theory and spoke of three conjectures: the Riemann hypothesis, Fermat's Last Theorem, and the transcendence of 2^{√2}. He mentioned to the audience that he did not expect anyone in the hall to live long enough to see a proof of this result. But the proof of this number's transcendence was published by Kuzmin in 1930, well within Hilbert's own lifetime. Namely, Kuzmin proved the case where the exponent b is a real quadratic irrational, which was later extended to an arbitrary algebraic irrational b by Gelfond and by Schneider.

== See also ==
- Gelfond's constant
