= Gelfond–Schneider theorem =

On the transcendence of a large class of numbers

In mathematics, the Gelfond–Schneider theorem establishes the transcendence of a large class of numbers.

== History ==
It was originally proved independently in 1934 by Aleksandr Gelfond and Theodor Schneider.

== Statement ==
If $a$ and $b$ are algebraic numbers with $a \not \in \{ 0,1 \}$ and $b \not \in Q$, then any value of $a^b$ is a transcendental number.

=== Comments ===
The values of $a$ and $b$ are not restricted to real numbers; complex numbers are allowed (here complex numbers are not regarded as rational when they have an imaginary part not equal to 0, even if both the real and imaginary parts are rational).

In general, $a^b = \text{exp} (b \ln a)$ is multivalued. This accounts for the phrase "any value of" in the theorem's statement.

An equivalent formulation of the theorem is the following: if $\alpha$ and $\gamma$ are nonzero algebraic numbers, and we take any non-zero logarithm of $\alpha$, then $(\ln \gamma )/( \ln \alpha)$ is either rational or transcendental. This may be expressed as saying that if $\ln \alpha$, $\ln \gamma$ are linearly independent over the rationals, then they are linearly independent over the algebraic numbers. The generalization of this statement to more general linear forms in logarithms of several algebraic numbers is in the domain of transcendental number theory.

If the restriction that a and b be algebraic is removed, the statement does not remain true in general. For example,
$${\left(\sqrt{2}^{\sqrt{2}}\right)}^{\sqrt{2}} = \sqrt{2}^{\sqrt{2} \cdot \sqrt{2}} = \sqrt{2}^2 = 2.$$
Here, $a$ is $\sqrt{2}^{\sqrt{2}}$, which (as proven by the theorem itself) is transcendental rather than algebraic. Similarly, if $a=3$ and $b = (\ln 2)/(\ln 3)$, which is transcendental, then $a^b = 2$ is algebraic. A characterization of the values for $a$ and $b$ which yield a transcendental $a^b$ is not known.

Kurt Mahler proved the p-adic analogue of the theorem: if $a$ and $b$ are in $\mathbf{C}_p$, the completion of the algebraic closure of $\mathbf{Q}_p$, and they are algebraic over $\mathbf{Q}$, and if $|a-1|_p<1$ and $|b-1|_p<1,$ then $(\log_p a)/(\log_p b)$ is either rational or transcendental, where $\log_p$ is the p-adic logarithm function.

== Corollaries ==
The transcendence of the following numbers follows immediately from the theorem:

- Gelfond–Schneider constant $2^{\sqrt{2}}=2.665144142\ldots$ and its square root $\sqrt{2}^{\sqrt{2}}=\sqrt{2^{\sqrt{2}}}= 1.632526919\ldots$
- Gelfond's constant $e^{\pi} = \left( e^{i \pi} \right)^{-i} = (-1)^{-i} = 23.14069263 \ldots$
- $i^i = \left( e^{\frac{i \pi}{2}} \right)^i = e^{-\frac{\pi}{2}} = \frac{1}{\sqrt{e^{\pi}}} = 0.207879576 \ldots$

== Applications ==
The Gelfond–Schneider theorem answers affirmatively Hilbert's seventh problem.

== See also ==
- Lindemann–Weierstrass theorem
- Baker's theorem; an extension of the result
- Schanuel's conjecture; if proven it would imply both the Gelfond–Schneider theorem and the Lindemann–Weierstrass theorem
