= Hilbert's seventh problem =

On transcendence of certain numbers

Hilbert's seventh problem is one of David Hilbert's list of open mathematical problems posed in 1900. It concerns the irrationality and transcendence of certain numbers.

== Background and the statement ==
In 1919, Hilbert gave a lecture on number theory and spoke of three conjectures: the Riemann hypothesis, Fermat's Last Theorem, and the transcendence of $2^\sqrt{2}$. He mentioned to the audience that he did not expect anyone in the hall to live long enough to see proof of this result. In his seventh problem, under the title "Irrationality and Transcendence of Certain Numbers" (Irrationalität und Transzendenz bestimmter Zahlen in German), two specific equivalent questions were asked:

1. In an isosceles triangle, if the ratio of the base angle to the angle at the vertex is algebraic but not rational, is the ratio between base and side always transcendental?
2. Is $a^b$ always transcendental, for algebraic $a \not\in \{0,1\}$ and irrational algebraic $b$?

For preliminary, an algebraic number is the root of a non-zero polynomial in one variable with rational coefficients, and a transcendental number is the opposite of an algebraic number (i.e., not the root of a polynomial). An irrational number is a number that cannot be expressed by the fraction of two integers; the denominator cannot be zero.

In addressing the second question more specifically, Hilbert asked about the transcendence and irrationality of the numbers $2^\sqrt{2}$ and $e^\pi = i^{-2i}$. The first number is known as the Gelfond–Schneider constant or the Hilbert number.

== Solution ==
The proof regarding the transcendence of $2^\sqrt{2}$ was published by Kuzmin in 1930, well within Hilbert's own lifetime. Namely, Kuzmin proved the case where the exponent $b$ is a real quadratic irrational.

In 1934, Aleksandr Gelfond and Theodor Schneider proved more generally, by extending the number $b$ to an arbitrary algebraic irrational. Respectively, they independently answered the second problem in the affirmative and refined it. This result is known as Gelfond's theorem or the Gelfond–Schneider theorem. From the generalization's point of view, this is the case
$$b \ln{\alpha} + \ln{\beta} = 0$$
of the general linear form in logarithms, which was studied by Gelfond and then solved by Alan Baker, who was awarded a Fields Medal in 1970 for this achievement. The result is called the Gelfond conjecture or Baker's theorem.

== Bibliography ==
- Tijdeman, Robert (1976). "On the Gel'fond–Baker method and its applications". In Felix E. Browder (ed.). Mathematical Developments Arising from Hilbert Problems. Proceedings of Symposia in Pure Mathematics. Vol. XXVIII.1. American Mathematical Society. pp. 241–268. ISBN 978-0-8218-1428-4. Zbl 0341.10026.
- Manin, Yu. I.; Panchishkin, A. A. (2007). Introduction to Modern Number Theory. Encyclopaedia of Mathematical Sciences. Vol. 49 (Second ed.). p. 61. ISBN 978-3-540-20364-3. ISSN 0938-0396. Zbl 1079.11002.
