= Alexander Gelfond =

Soviet mathematician

- Born: 24 October 1906; Saint Petersburg, Russian Empire
- Died: 7 November 1968 (aged 62); Moscow, Soviet Union
- Resting place: Novodevichy Cemetery
- Citizenship: Soviet Union
- Education: Moscow State University
- Known for: Gelfond's theorem
- Scientific career
- Fields: Mathematics
- Workplaces: Moscow State University; Steklov Mathematical Institute
- Doctoral advisor: Alexander Khinchin; Vyacheslav Stepanov
- Doctoral students: Gregory Freiman

Alexander Osipovich Gelfond (Russian: Алекса́ндр О́сипович Ге́льфонд; 24 October 1906 – 7 November 1968) was a Soviet mathematician. Gelfond's theorem, also known as the Gelfond–Schneider theorem, is named after him.

== Biography ==
Alexander Gelfond was born in Saint Petersburg, Russian Empire, the son of a professional physician and amateur philosopher Osip Gelfond. He entered Moscow State University in 1924, started his postgraduate studies there in 1927, and obtained his Ph.D. in 1930. His advisors were Aleksandr Khinchin (1894-1959) and Vyacheslav Stepanov (1889-1950).

In 1930, he stayed for five months in Germany (in Berlin and Göttingen) where he worked with Edmund Landau, Carl Ludwig Siegel, and David Hilbert. In 1931 he started teaching as a Professor at the Moscow State University and worked there until the last day of his life. Since 1933 he also worked at the Steklov Institute of Mathematics.

In 1939, he was elected a Corresponding member of the Academy of Sciences of the Soviet Union for his works in the field of Cryptography. According to Vladimir Arnold, during World War II Gelfond was the Chief Cryptographer of the Soviet Navy.

== Results ==
Gelfond obtained important results in several mathematical domains including number theory, analytic functions, integral equations, and the history of mathematics, but his most famous result is his eponymous theorem:

If α and β are algebraic numbers (with α ≠ 0 and α ≠ 1), and if β is not a real rational number, then any value of α^{β} is a transcendental number.

This is the famous 7th Hilbert's problem. Gelfond proved a special case of the theorem in 1929 when he was a postgraduate student and fully proved it in 1934. The same theorem was independently proven by Theodor Schneider, and so the theorem is often known as the Gelfond–Schneider theorem. In 1929 Gelfond proposed an extension of the theorem known as Gelfond's conjecture that was proven by Alan Baker in 1966.

Before Gelfond's works only a few numbers such as e and π were known to be transcendental. After his works, an infinite number of transcendentals could be easily obtained. Some of them are named in Gelfond's honor:

- 2^{√2} is known as the Gelfond–Schneider constant
- e^{π} is known as Gelfond's constant.

== Awards ==
- Order of Lenin
- Order of the Red Banner of Labour
- Medal "For the Defence of Moscow"
- Medal "For Valiant Labour in the Great Patriotic War 1941–1945"
- Jubilee Medal "Twenty Years of Victory in the Great Patriotic War 1941–1945"
