= Euler's identity =

Mathematical equation linking e, i and π

In mathematics, Euler's identity (Note: The term "Euler's identity" (or "Euler identity") is also used elsewhere to refer to other concepts, including the related general formula e^{ix} = cos x + i sin x, and the Euler product formula. See also List of topics named after Leonhard Euler.) (also known as Euler's equation) is the equality
$$e^{i \pi} + 1 = 0$$
where

- $e$ is Euler's number, the base of natural logarithms,
- $i$ is the imaginary unit, which by definition satisfies $i^2 = -1$, and
- $\pi$ is pi, the ratio of the circumference of a circle to its diameter.

Euler's identity is named after the Swiss mathematician Leonhard Euler. It is a special case of Euler's formula $e^{ix} = \cos x + i\sin x$ when evaluated for $x = \pi$. Euler's identity is considered an exemplar of mathematical beauty, as it involves several of the most important numbers in mathematics.

== Mathematical beauty ==
Euler's identity is often cited as an example of deep mathematical beauty. Three of the basic arithmetic operations occur exactly once each: addition, multiplication, and exponentiation. The identity also links five fundamental mathematical constants:

- The number 0, the additive identity
- The number 1, the multiplicative identity
- The number π (π = 3.14159...), the fundamental circle constant
- The number e (e = 2.71828...), also known as Euler's number, which occurs widely in mathematical analysis
- The number i, the imaginary unit such that i^{2} = −1

The equation is often given in the form of an expression set equal to zero, which is common practice in several areas of mathematics.

Stanford University mathematics professor Keith Devlin has said, "like a Shakespearean sonnet that captures the very essence of love, or a painting that brings out the beauty of the human form that is far more than just skin deep, Euler's equation reaches down into the very depths of existence". Paul Nahin, a professor emeritus at the University of New Hampshire who wrote a book dedicated to Euler's formula and its applications in Fourier analysis, said Euler's identity is "of exquisite beauty".

Mathematics writer Constance Reid has said that Euler's identity is "the most famous formula in all mathematics". Benjamin Peirce, a 19th-century American philosopher, mathematician, and professor at Harvard University, after proving Euler's identity during a lecture, said that it "is absolutely paradoxical; we cannot understand it, and we don't know what it means, but we have proved it, and therefore we know it must be the truth".

A 1990 poll of readers by The Mathematical Intelligencer named Euler's identity the "most beautiful theorem in mathematics". In a 2004 poll of readers by Physics World, Euler's identity tied with Maxwell's equations (of electromagnetism) as the "greatest equation ever".

At least three books in popular mathematics have been published about Euler's identity:

- Dr. Euler's Fabulous Formula: Cures Many Mathematical Ills, by Paul Nahin (2011)
- A Most Elegant Equation: Euler's formula and the beauty of mathematics, by David Stipp (2017)
- Euler's Pioneering Equation: The most beautiful theorem in mathematics, by Robin Wilson (2018)

== Explanations ==
=== Imaginary exponents ===
In this animation N takes various increasing values from 1 to 100. The computation of (1 + iπ/N)^{N} is displayed as the combined effect of N repeated multiplications in the complex plane, with the final point being the actual value of (1 + iπ/N)^{N}. It can be seen that as N gets larger (1 + iπ/N)^{N} approaches a limit of −1.

Euler's identity asserts that $e^{i\pi}$ is equal to −1. The expression $e^{i\pi}$ is a special case of the expression $e^z$, where z is any complex number. In general, $e^z$ is defined for complex z by extending one of the definitions of the exponential function from real exponents to complex exponents. For example, one common definition is:

$$e^z = \lim_{n\to\infty} \left(1+\frac z n \right)^n.$$

Euler's identity therefore states that the limit, as n approaches infinity, of $(1 + \tfrac {i\pi}{n})^n$ is equal to −1. This limit is illustrated in the animation to the right.

Euler's formula for a general angle

Euler's identity is a special case of Euler's formula, which states that for any real number x,

$$e^{ix} = \cos x + i\sin x$$

where the inputs of the trigonometric functions sine and cosine are given in radians.

In particular, when x = π,

$$e^{i \pi} = \cos \pi + i\sin \pi.$$

Since

$$\cos \pi = -1$$

and

$$\sin \pi = 0,$$

it follows that

$$e^{i \pi} = -1 + 0 i,$$

which yields Euler's identity:

$$e^{i \pi} +1 = 0.$$

=== Geometric interpretation ===
Any complex number $z = x + iy$ can be represented by the point $(x, y)$ on the complex plane. This point can also be represented in polar coordinates as $(r, \theta)$, where r is the absolute value of z (distance from the origin), and $\theta$ is the argument of z (angle counterclockwise from the positive x-axis). By the definitions of sine and cosine, this point has cartesian coordinates of $(r \cos \theta, r \sin \theta)$, implying that $z = r(\cos \theta + i \sin \theta)$. According to Euler's formula, this is equivalent to saying $z = r e^{i\theta}$.

Euler's identity says that $-1 = e^{i\pi}$. Since $e^{i\pi}$ is $r e^{i\theta}$ for r = 1 and $\theta = \pi$, this can be interpreted as a fact about the number −1 on the complex plane: its distance from the origin is 1, and its angle from the positive x-axis is $\pi$ radians.

Additionally, when any complex number z is multiplied by $e^{i\theta}$, it has the effect of rotating $z$ counterclockwise by an angle of $\theta$ on the complex plane. Since multiplication by −1 reflects a point across the origin, Euler's identity can be interpreted as saying that rotating any point $\pi$ radians around the origin has the same effect as reflecting the point across the origin. Similarly, setting $\theta$ equal to $2\pi$ yields the related equation $e^{2\pi i} = 1$, which can be interpreted as saying that rotating any point by one turn around the origin returns it to its original position.

== Generalizations ==
Euler's identity is also a special case of the more general identity that the nth roots of unity, for n > 1, add up to 0:

$$\sum_{k=0}^{n-1} e^{2 \pi i \frac{k}{n}} = 0 .$$

Euler's identity is the case where n = 2.

A similar identity also applies to quaternion exponential: let {i, j, k} be the basis quaternions; then,
$$e^{\frac{1}{\sqrt 3}(i \pm j \pm k)\pi} + 1 = 0.$$

More generally, let q be a quaternion with a zero real part and a norm equal to 1; that is, $q=ai+bj+ck,$ with $a^2+b^2+c^2=1.$ Then one has
$$e^{q\pi} + 1 = 0.$$

The same formula applies to octonions, with a zero real part and a norm equal to 1. These formulas are a direct generalization of Euler's identity, since $i$ and $-i$ are the only complex numbers with a zero real part and a norm (absolute value) equal to 1.

== History ==
Euler's identity is a direct result of Euler's formula, first published in his monumental 1748 work of mathematical analysis, Introductio in analysin infinitorum, but it is questionable whether the particular concept of linking five fundamental constants in a compact form can be attributed to Euler himself, as he may never have expressed it.

Robin Wilson writes:

We've seen how [Euler's identity] can easily be deduced from results of Johann Bernoulli and Roger Cotes, but that neither of them seem to have done so. Even Euler does not seem to have written it down explicitly—and certainly it doesn't appear in any of his publications—though he must surely have realized that it follows immediately from his identity [i.e. Euler's formula], e^{ix} = cos x + i sin x. Moreover, it seems to be unknown who first stated the result explicitly

== See also ==
- De Moivre's formula
- Exponential function
- Gelfond's constant
- List of topics named after Leonhard Euler
