= Algebraic independence =

Set without nontrivial polynomial equalities

In abstract algebra, a subset $S$ of a field $L$ is algebraically independent over a subfield $K$ if the elements of $S$ do not satisfy any non-trivial polynomial equation with coefficients in $K$.

In particular, a one element set $\{\alpha\}$ is algebraically independent over $K$ if and only if $\alpha$ is transcendental over $K$. In general, any element of an algebraically independent set $S$ over $K$ is by necessity transcendental over $K$, and over all of the field extensions of $K$ generated by the remaining elements of $S$.

== Example ==
The real numbers $\sqrt{\pi}$ and $2\pi+1$ are transcendental numbers: they are not the roots of any nontrivial polynomial whose coefficients are rational numbers. Thus, the sets $\{\sqrt{\pi}\}$ and $\{2\pi+1\}$ are both algebraically independent over the rational numbers.

However, the set $\{ \sqrt{\pi}, 2\pi+1 \}$ is not algebraically independent over the rational numbers $\mathbb{Q}$, because the nontrivial polynomial

$$P(x,y)=2x^2-y+1$$

is zero when $x=\sqrt{\pi}$ and $y=2\pi+1$.

== Algebraic independence of known constants ==
Although π and e are transcendental, it is not known whether $\{ \pi , e \}$ is algebraically independent over $\mathbb{Q}$. In fact, it is not even known whether $\pi+e$ is irrational. Nesterenko proved in 1996 that:

- the numbers $\pi$, $e^\pi$, and $\Gamma(1/4)$, where $\Gamma$ is the gamma function, are algebraically independent over $\mathbb{Q}$.
- the numbers $\pi, e^{\pi\sqrt{3}}$, and $\Gamma(1/3)$ are algebraically independent over $\mathbb{Q}.$
- for all positive integers n, the numbers $\pi$ and $e^{\pi\sqrt{n}}$ are algebraically independent over $\mathbb{Q}.$

== Results and open problems ==
The Lindemann–Weierstrass theorem can often be used to prove that some sets are algebraically independent over $\mathbb{Q}$. It states that whenever $\alpha_1,\ldots,\alpha_n$ are algebraic numbers that are linearly independent over $\mathbb{Q}$, then $e^{\alpha_1},\ldots,e^{\alpha_n}$ are also algebraically independent over $\mathbb{Q}$.

The Schanuel conjecture would establish the algebraic independence of many numbers, including π and e, but remains unproven:

Let $\{z_1,...,z_n\}$ be any set of $n$ complex numbers that are linearly independent over $\mathbb Q$. The field extension $\mathbb Q (z_1,...,z_n,e^{z_1},...,e^{z_n})$ has transcendence degree at least $n$ over $\mathbb Q$.

== Algebraic matroids ==
Given a field extension $L/K$ that is not algebraic, Zorn's lemma can be used to show that there always exists a maximal algebraically independent subset of $L$ over $K$. Further, all the maximal algebraically independent subsets have the same cardinality, known as the transcendence degree of the extension.

For every finite set $S$ of elements of $L$, the algebraically independent subsets of $S$ satisfy the axioms that define the independent sets of a matroid. In this matroid, the rank of a set of elements is its transcendence degree, and the flat generated by a set $T$ of elements is the intersection of $L$ with the field $K[T]$. A matroid that can be generated in this way is called an algebraic matroid. No good characterization of algebraic matroids is known, but certain matroids are known to be non-algebraic; the smallest is the Vámos matroid.

Many finite matroids may be represented by a matrix over a field $K$, in which the matroid elements correspond to matrix columns, and a set of elements is independent if the corresponding set of columns is linearly independent. Every matroid with a linear representation of this type may also be represented as an algebraic matroid, by choosing an indeterminate for each row of the matrix, and by using the matrix coefficients within each column to assign each matroid element a linear combination of these transcendentals. The converse is false: not every algebraic matroid has a linear representation.

== See also ==
- Linear independence
- Transcendental number
- Lindemann–Weierstrass theorem
- Schanuel's conjecture
