= Theodor Schneider =

German mathematician (1911–1988)

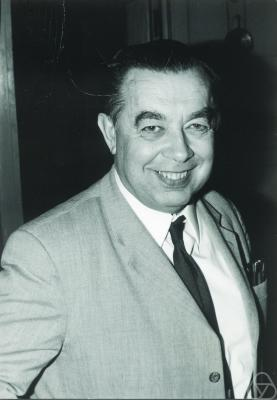
Theodor Schneider 1970

Theodor Schneider (7 May 1911 – 31 October 1988) was a German mathematician, best known for providing proof of what is now known as the Gelfond–Schneider theorem, who was born in Frankfurt am Main and died in Freiburg im Breisgau.

Schneider studied from 1929 to 1934 in Frankfurt; he solved Hilbert's 7th problem in his PhD thesis, which then came to be known as the Gelfond–Schneider theorem. Later, he became an assistant to Carl Ludwig Siegel in Göttingen, where he stayed until 1953. Then, he became a professor in Erlangen (1953–1959) and finally until his retirement in Freiburg (1959–1976). During his time in Freiburg, he also served as the director of the Mathematical Research Institute of Oberwolfach from 1959 to 1963. His doctoral students include H. P. Schlickewei.

== Works ==
- Einführung in die transzendenten Zahlen, Springer 1957 (German, French translation 1959)
- Transzendenzuntersuchungen periodischer Funktionen, Teil 1,2, Journal für die Reine und Angewandte Mathematik, volume 172, 1934, pp. 65–69, 70-74, online: part 1, part 2 (dissertation in which he solved Hilbert's 7th problem, German)

== See also ==
- Schneider–Lang theorem
