= Suhl (disambiguation) =

Suhl is a town in Thuringia, Germany.

Suhl may also refer to:

- Bezirk Suhl, a district of the GDR
- Suhl (Weihe), a river of Thuringia and Hesse, Germany, tributary of the Weihe
- Suhl (Werra), a river of Thuringia, Germany, tributary of the Werra
- Sunshine Hockey League (SuHL)

== People with that surname ==
- Eckart Suhl (born 1943), German field hockey player
- Harry Suhl (born 1922), German-American physicist
- Leena Suhl (born 1953), Finnish-German operations researcher
- Sebastian Suhl (born 1969), American fashion industry executive
