= Bernard Michael Gilroy =

American economist

Bernard Michael Gilroy (*10 October 1956 in New York City, USA) is an American economist and full professor of international economics and macroeconomics at the University of Paderborn, Germany.

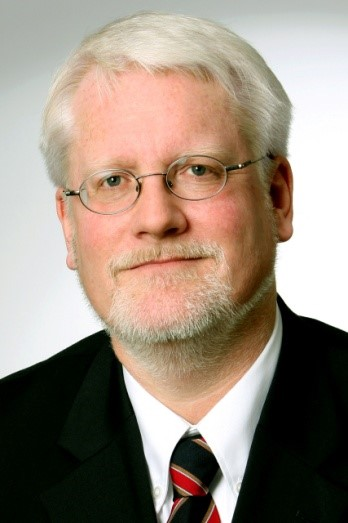
Bernard Michael Gilroy

== Short biography ==
Bernard Michael Gilroy attended Roselle Park Elementary School in New Jersey, USA from 1961 to 1970 before attending Roselle Park High School until 1974.

Gilroy earned his B.A. (with honors) studying “Multinational Corporate Studies/German Translation Program” from 1974 to 1978 at Upsala College in New Jersey, USA. He participated in the “Rutgers University Junior Year Abroad Program” as an exchange student and studied at the University of Konstanz, Germany from 1976 to 1977.

In 1977, Gilroy started studying economics at the University of Konstanz, where he earned his diploma (Master's Degree) with the thesis “Stability Optimism and its Importance in Monetarist Theory”. From 1987 to 1989 he was scientific research assistant at the chair of Economics of Professor Dr. Robert Leu at the University of St. Gallen, Switzerland where he started his doctoral studies. In 1989, Gilroy earned his Ph.D. from the University of St. Gallen with the thesis “Economic Issues of Multinational Enterprise”. Thereafter he worked as a full-time lecturer in economics until 1995. During this time, he was a visiting scholar (1991 to 1992) at the University of Reading, UK. In October 1993, Gilroy completed his inaugural dissertation (habilitation) at the University of St. Gallen on the subject “Networking in Multinational Enterprises: The Importance of Strategic Alliances” where he was elected assistant professor of economics. In October 1996 till today, he was appointed full professor of International Economics and Macroeconomics at the University of Paderborn, Germany. From 2003 to 2007, Gilroy was pro-rector (University Vice President) for student affairs, advanced education and international relations of the University of Paderborn.

His main research focus lies on foreign trade theory and policy, macroeconomics as well as multinational corporations and development economics.

== Publications ==
=== Books ===
- with Thomas Gries and W. Naudè (ed.): Multinational Enterprises, Foreign Direct Investment and Growth in Africa: South African Perspectives. Physica, Heidelberg 2004, ISBN 3-7908-0276-X.
- Networking in Multinational Enterprises: The Importance of Strategic Alliances. University of South Carolina Press, Columbia, South Carolina 1993, ISBN 0-87249-845-X.
- with Udo Broll: Außenwirtschaft – Einführung und neuere Ansätze. R. Oldenbourg, Munich 1989, 2nd Edition. 1994.
- Economic Issues of Multinational Enterprise. Hartung-Gorre, Constance 1989, ISBN 3-89191-297-8.

=== Articles in journals and anthologies ===
- with Mark Schopf and Anastasia Heimann: Gibt es eine optimale Frauenquote? In: WiSt-Wirtschaftswissenschaftliches Studium. 2/2014, pp. 85–91.
- with Heike Schreckenberg and Volker Seiler: Subsidiarity between Economic Freedom and Harmonized Regulation: Is there an Optimal Degree of European Integration? In: Federal Governance. Vol. 10, No. 2, 2013, pp. 3–8, https://web.archive.org/web/20160304043049/http://library.queensu.ca/ojs/index.php/fedgov/article/view/4536
- with Elmar Lukas and Christian Heimann: Technologiestandort Deutschland und internationale Wissensspillover – Welchen Einfluss nehmen ausländische MNU auf deutsche Exporte? In: Jahrbücher für Nationalökonomie und Statistik. Vol. 233, No. 5+6, 2013.
- with Mark Schopf and Anastasia Heimann: Basic Income and Labour Supply: The German Case. In: Basic Income Studies. Vol. 8, No. 1, 2013, pp. 43–70, http://www.degruyter.com/view/j/bis.2013.8.issue-1/bis-2012-0009/bis-2012-0009.xml
- with Birke Thuy Duong Nguyen: Ist Fairer Handel Wirklich Fair? In: WiSt-Wirtschaftswissenschaftliches Studium. 3/2013, pp. 134–140.
- with Daniel Kruse: Die Prinzipal-Agent-Theorie als Erklärungsinstrumentarium von Korruption: Angewendet auf den Praxisfall „Siemens“. In: WiSt-Wirtschaftswissenschaftliches Studium. 3/2012, pp. 143–150.
- with Tobias Volpert: Die Funktionen eines Patentsystems und ihre Bedeutung für Unternehmensausgründungen aus Hochschulen. In: M. Asche, W. Bauhus, E. Mitschke, B. Seel (ed.): Open Source: Kommerzialisierungsmöglichkeiten und Chancen für die Zusammenarbeit von Hochschulen und Unternehmen. 2008, pp. 21–40.
- with Melanie Beier and Elmar Lukas: Small- and Medium-sized Enterprises (SMEs) in internationally operating R&D networks: recent findings and Trends. In: International Journal of Globalisation and Small Business. Vol. 2, No. 3, 2008, pp. 325–341, http://inderscience.metapress.com/content/200qt2772712446q
- with Elmar Lukas: The Choice between Greenfield Investment and Cross-border Acquisition: A Real Options Approach. In: The Quarterly Review of Economics and Finance. Vol. 46, No. 3, July, 2006, pp. 447–465, http://ideas.repec.org/a/eee/quaeco/v46y2006i3p447-465.html
- with Elmar Lukas: On the Dynamics of Innovative Strategic Alliances in Korea. In: The Journal of the Korean Economy. Vol. 7, No. 1, Spring, 2006, pp. 1–19, https://web.archive.org/web/20160304121915/http://www.akes.or.kr/akes/downfile/3.proofreading051212_a.pdf
- with Elmar Lukas and Tobias Volpert: The European „No-Frills“-Aviation Market: Current and Future Developments. In: Peter Forsyth, David Gillen, Otto G. Mayer, Hans-Martin Niemeier (Hrsg.): Competition versus Predation in Aviation Markets: A Survey of Experience in North America, Europe and Australia. Ashgate, Aldershot, (in association with the German Aviation Research Society), Chapter 11, 2005, pp. 203–237.
- Wird die Kultur Opfer der Wirtschaft? In: Fremdes vertraut machen – mit Sprachen zur Kultur. (Bericht über eine Schülerakademie im Rahmen der Begabtenförderung, Landesinstitut für Schule/Qualitätsagentur NRW in Verbindung mit der Werner-Gehring-Stiftung), Soest, 2005, pp. 52–67.
- Realoptionstheorie und Standortentscheidungen multinationaler Unternehmen. In: Günther Greulich, Manfred Lösch, Christian Müller, Winfried Stier (ed.): Empirische Konjunktur- und Wachstumsforschung. Rüegger, 2005, pp. 41–55.
- with Elmar Lukas and Udo Broll: Risiko, derivative Märkte und dynamische Optimierung. In: WISU – das Wirtschaftsstudium. 10/04, 2004, pp. 1–5.
- with Elmar Lukas: Ökonomische Theorie im Alltag: Hedge Fonds. In: WISU – das Wirtschaftsstudium. 2005.
- Das Mundell-Fleming Modell. In: WISU – das Wirtschaftsstudium. No. 7, July 2004, pp. 934–941.
- with Udo Broll: Managing Sovereign Credit Risk with Derivatives. In: Alexander Karmann, Michael Frenkel, Bert Schollens (ed.): Sovereign Risk and Financial Crises. Springer, 2004, https://link.springer.com/chapter/10.1007/978-3-662-09950-6_6#
- with Tobias Volpert: Die EU-Richtlinie für Genpatente – eine Rechtsvorschrift aus Sicht der Volkswirtschaftslehre. In: Schmollers Jahrbuch: Zeitschrift für Wirtschafts- und Sozialwissenschaften (Journal of Applied Social Sciences Studies). No., 2003, S. 563–579.
- with Udo Broll and J. E. Wahl: Unternehmensinterne Kommunikation und Risikopolitik. In: W. Dangelmaier, T. Gajewski, C. Kösters (ed.): Innovationen im E-Business. Fraunhofer ALB, Vol. 10, ALB-HNI series, 2003, pp. 139–149.
- with Udo Broll: Global Supply, E-Business und Währungsmanagement. In: W. Dangelmaier, A. Emmerich, D. Kaschula (ed.): Modelle in E-Business. Fraunhofer ALB, Vol. 8, ALB-HNI series, 2002, pp. 19–25.
- with Elmar Lukas: The New Agenda for FDI: Evidence from South Korea and Germany. In: The Journal of Business Administration. Vol. 2, No. 1, October 31, 2002, pp. 67–85.
- with Elmar Lukas: Bewertung strategischer Wachstumsoptionen bei M&A-Transaktionen innerhalb der Telekommunikationsbranche. In: M & A Review. No. 7, 2002, pp. 380–385.
- with Tobias Volpert: Economic Insights and Deficits in European Biotechnology Patent Policy. In: Intereconomics: Review of European Economic Policy. Vol. 37, No. 3, 2002, pp. 150–155, https://link.springer.com/article/10.1007/BF02928874
- with Tobias Volpert: Ökonomische Theorie im Alltag: Patente in der Gentechnik. In: WISU – das Wirtschaftsstudium. 5/2002, pp. 664–666.
- with Tobias Volpert: Ökonomische Theorie im Alltag: Strategische Handels- und Industriepolitik im internationalen Wettbewerb. In: WISU – das Wirtschaftsstudium. 2/2002, pp. 206–208.
- Globalisation, Multinational Enterprises and European Integration Pocesses: Some Insights for International Human Resource Management. In: A. W. Clermont, D. Schmeisser, D. Krimphove (ed.): Strategisches Personalmanagement in Global Unternehmen. Vahlen, 2001, pp. 25–42.
- with Tobias Volpert: Zukunftsfelder ökonomischer Forschung im Bereich des Internet. Opensource, April/May, 2000, pp. 8–11.
- Beschäftigungswirkungen multinationaler Unternehmungen. In: Wolfgang Brandes und Peter Weise (ed.): Ökonomie und Gesellschaft: Unternehmungsverhalten und Arbeitslosigkeit. Yearbook 15, Campus, Frankfurt 2000, pp. 306–332.
- A Primer on Internet Economics. In: Thomas Gries, Leena Suhl (ed.): Economic Aspects of Digital Information Technologies. Gabler, Deutscher Universitätsverlag, Wiesbaden 1999, pp. 1–16.
- Die Globalisierungsfalle: Gibt es sie wirklich? In: Elisabeth Fish, Hartmut Vollmer (ed.): Einblicke – Ausblicke: 25 Jahre Universität Paderborn. Bonifitius, Paderborn 1998, pp. 76–85.
- International Competitiveness, Multinational Enterprise Technology Clubs, and the Government Interface. In: K. Jäger, K. J. Koch (ed.): Trade, Growth and Economic Policy in Open Economies. Springer, 1998, pp. 13–30.
- with Alan Webster: Labour Skills and the UK’s Comparative Advantage with its European Community Partners. In: Applied Economics. Vol. 27, No. 4, April 1995, pp. 327–343.
- Economic Freedom Versus Harmonized Regulation: Is There An Optimal Degree of European Integration? In: Fatemi, Khosrow (ed.): The Globalization of Business in the 1990s: Implications for Trade and Investment (Proceedings of the Fourth International Conference of the International Trade and Finance Association, July 13–16, Reading England), Part III The European Community, Chapter 10, Texas A & M International University, 1994, pp. 151–167.
- Krank und Teuer: Ordnungspolitische Fehlleistungen im schweizerischen Gesundheitswesen. In: Peter Füglistaler (ed.): Hilfe die Schweiz Schrumpft! Orell Füssli, 1994, pp. 78–94.
- Firmeninterner Handel. In: WiSt - Wirtschaftswissenschaftliches Studium. No. 9, September 1992, pp. 467–471.
- Schweizerische Pflichtlagerhaltung und ihre Finanzierung. In: Schweizerische Zeitschrift für Volkswirtschaft und Statistik. September issue, 1991, pp. 431–443.
- Faktorgehalt und Internationaler Handel. In: Jahrbuch für Sozialwissenschaft. No. 1, 1991, pp. 1–14.
- Intra-Firm Trade. In: Journal of Economic Surveys. Vol. 3, No. 4, 1989, pp. 325–343, http://onlinelibrary.wiley.com/doi/10.1111/j.1467-6419.1989.tb00074.x/full
- Session No. 4: New Forms of Internationalization in Business/ Discussion. In: Silvio Borner (ed.): International Economic Association, Basle Round Table Conference Volume: International Finance and Trade in a Polycen-tric World. McMillan Publishers, 1988, pp. 300–307.
- with Udo Broll: International Cooperation and Intra-Industrial Transactions. In: Journal of International Economic Integration. Vol. 3, No. 2, Autumn 1988, pp. 79–87, https://www.jstor.org/stable/23000018
- with Udo Broll: Market Behaviour, Information Asymmetries and Product Qualities. In: The Indian Journal of Economics. Centenary Volume LXVIII, Part III, No. 270, January 1988, pp. 455–466.
- with Udo Broll: Intra-Industry Trade and Differences in Technology. In: Scottish Journal of Political Economy. Vol. 35, No. 4, November 1988, pp. 398–403, http://onlinelibrary.wiley.com/doi/10.1111/j.1467-9485.1988.tb01065.x/abstract
- Session No. 3: European Technology Initiatives and Global Competition/Discussion. In: Aussenwirtschaft. Year 43, No. I/II, 1988, pp. 259–266.
- Die Schweiz im Spannungsfeld der Welthandels- und Strukturanpassungsprobleme. In: Journal für Entwicklungspolitik. Vol. 2, 1988, pp. 33–45.
- with Udo Broll: German Multinationals. In: Multinational Business Quarterly. No. 1, 1987, pp. 1–11.
- with Udo Broll: Intra-Industrieller Aussenhandel. In: WiSt – Wirtschaftswissenschaftliches Studium. Year 16, No. 7, July 1987, pp. 359–361.
- with Udo Broll: Indian Industrialization, Multinational Enterprises and Gains From Trade. In: The Indian Journal of Economics. Vol. 67, October 1986, pp. 231–239.
- with Udo Broll: Collateral in Banking Policy and Adverse Selection. In: The Manchester School. December 1986, pp. 357–366.
- with Udo Broll: Comparative Advantage And Trade Patterns. In: Jahrbuch für Sozialwissenschaft. No. 3, 1986, pp. 321–324.
- with Udo Broll: Developing Countries In Light of Intra-Trade. In: Asian Economies. No. 55, December 1985, pp. 20–28.
- with Udo Broll: Marktverhalten bei Qualitätsunsicherheit – Ein einfaches Beispiel. In: WiSt – Wirtschaftswissenschaftliches Studium. No. 6, June 1985, pp. 303–310.
- with Udo Broll: International Division of Labour and Intra-Trade. In: Economia Internazionale. Vol. XXXVIII, 2, May 1985, pp. 161–167.
