= Commute =

Commute, commutation or commutative may refer to:

- Commuting, the process of travelling between a place of residence and a place of work

== Mathematics ==
- Commutative property, a property of a mathematical operation whose result is insensitive to the order of its arguments
  - Equivariant map, a function whose composition with another function has the commutative property
  - Commutative diagram, a graphical description of commuting compositions of arrows in a mathematical category
  - Commutative semigroup, commutative monoid, abelian group, and commutative ring, algebraic structures with the commutative property
  - Commuting matrices, sets of matrices whose products do not depend on the order of multiplication
  - Commutator, a measure of the failure of two elements to be commutative in a group or ring
- Commutation matrix, a permutation matrix which is used for transforming the vectorized form of another matrix into the vectorized form of its transpose

== Science and technology ==
- Commutator (electric), a rotary switch on the shaft of an electric motor or generator
- Commutation (neurophysiology), how certain neural circuits in the brain exhibit noncommutativity
- Commutation (telemetry), a form of time-division multiplexing
- Commutation, a synonym for packet switching in computer networking and telecommunications

== Other uses ==
- Commutation (law) (of sentence), a reduction in severity of punishment
- Commutation (finance) (law) to lessen periodic dues (usually rents, fares or tithes) by paying a lump sum
- Commutation (finance) under a cash option, encashment. The act of a pension member/annuitant who gives up part or all in exchange for a lump sum payment.
