= Kliewer =

Kliewer is a surname. Notable people with the surname include:

- Cliff Kliewer (1927–1987), Canadian football player
- Natalia Kliewer (fl. 2005), Kyrgyz-German operations researcher
- Steven Kliewer (fl. 2015), American biochemist
