= Arian Pregenzer =

American nuclear security expert

Arian Leigh Pregenzer (born 1953) is an American physicist specializing in nuclear security, arms control, and nuclear proliferation. She is retired from the Sandia National Laboratories.

== Education and career ==
Pregenzer was an undergraduate at the University of New Mexico, where she studied a combination of physics, mathematics, and philosophy, graduating in 1978. She completed her Ph.D. in 1983 at the University of California, San Diego. Her dissertation, Validity of Brownian motion theory of activated processes: Sublimation, concerned research supervised by Harry Suhl.

She worked at the Sandia National Laboratories, initially on the generation of lithium-ion beams for inertial confinement fusion, and later in the Global Security Program. In 1994 she founded Sandia's Cooperative Monitoring Center, and she became a member of the Council on Foreign Relations. She retired as a senior scientist from Sandia in 2011.

== Recognition ==
In 2012, Pregenzer won the Joseph A. Burton Forum Award of the American Physical Society (APS), "for her intellectual and managerial leadership in creating centers that allow international technical and policy experts to explore confidence building measures and other arms control regimes". In the same year she was named a Fellow of the American Physical Society, after a nomination from the APS Forum on Physics and Society, "for her leadership in advancing arms control monitoring and verification technologies and for establishing and leading international scientific cooperation for arms control and international security".

== Personal life ==
In her retirement, Pregenzer paints watercolors, and has worked as a wilderness guide and environmental volunteer. She and her husband own a 160 acres (65 ha) property named Solitaire Springs, surrounded by the Cibola National Forest, and in 2019 donated a conservation easement on the property to the New Mexico Land Conservancy.
