= Catalan's conjecture =

Theorem about consecutive perfect powers

Catalan's conjecture (or Mihăilescu's theorem) is a theorem in number theory that was conjectured by the mathematician Eugène Charles Catalan in 1842 and proven in 2002 by Preda Mihăilescu at Paderborn University. The integers 2^{3} and 3^{2} are two perfect powers (that is, powers of exponent higher than one) of natural numbers whose values (8 and 9, respectively) are consecutive. The theorem states that this is the only case of two consecutive perfect powers. That is to say, that

Catalan's conjecture—the only solution in the natural numbers of

$$x^a - y^b = 1$$

for a, b > 1, x, y > 0 is x = 3, a = 2, y = 2, b = 3.

== History ==
The history of the problem dates back at least to Gersonides, who proved a special case of the conjecture in 1343 where (x, y) was restricted to be (2, 3) or (3, 2). The first significant progress after Catalan made his conjecture came in 1850 when Victor-Amédée Lebesgue dealt with the case b = 2.

In 1976, Robert Tijdeman applied Baker's method in transcendence theory to establish a bound on a,b and used existing results bounding x,y in terms of a, b to give an effective upper bound for x,y,a,b. Michel Langevin computed a value of $\exp \exp \exp \exp 730 \approx 10^{10^{10^{10^{317}}}}$ for the bound, resolving Catalan's conjecture for all but a finite number of cases.

Catalan's conjecture was proven by Preda Mihăilescu in April 2002. The proof was published in the Journal für die reine und angewandte Mathematik, 2004. It makes extensive use of the theory of cyclotomic fields and Galois modules. An exposition of the proof was given by Yuri Bilu in the Séminaire Bourbaki. In 2005, Mihăilescu published a simplified proof.

== Pillai's conjecture ==
Unsolved problem in mathematics
Does each positive integer occur only finitely many times as a difference of perfect powers?
More unsolved problems in mathematics

Pillai's conjecture concerns a general difference of perfect powers (sequence A001597 in the OEIS): it is an open problem initially proposed by S. S. Pillai, who conjectured that the gaps in the sequence of perfect powers tend to infinity. This is equivalent to saying that each positive integer occurs only finitely many times as a difference of perfect powers: more generally, in 1931 Pillai conjectured that for fixed positive integers A, B, C the equation $Ax^n - By^m = C$ has only finitely many solutions (x, y, m, n) with (m, n) ≠ (2, 2). Pillai proved that for fixed A, B, x, y, and for any λ less than 1, we have $|Ax^n - By^m| \gg x^{\lambda n}$ uniformly in m and n.

The general conjecture would follow from the ABC conjecture.

Pillai's conjecture means that for every natural number n, there are only finitely many pairs of perfect powers with difference n. The list below shows, for n ≤ 64, all solutions for perfect powers less than 10^{18}, such that the exponent of both powers is greater than 1. The number of such solutions for each n is listed at (sequence A076427 in the OEIS). See also (sequence A103953 in the OEIS) for the smallest solution (> 0).

n	solution count	numbers k such that k and k + n are both perfect powers	n	solution count	numbers k such that k and k + n are both perfect powers
1	1	8	33	2	16, 256
2	1	25	34	0	none
3	2	1, 125	35	3	1, 289, 1296
4	3	4, 32, 121	36	2	64, 1728
5	2	4, 27	37	3	27, 324, 14348907
6	0	none	38	1	1331
7	5	1, 9, 25, 121, 32761	39	4	25, 361, 961, 10609
8	3	1, 8, 97336	40	4	9, 81, 216, 2704
9	4	16, 27, 216, 64000	41	3	8, 128, 400
10	1	2187	42	0	none
11	4	16, 25, 3125, 3364	43	1	441
12	2	4, 2197	44	3	81, 100, 125
13	3	36, 243, 4900	45	4	4, 36, 484, 9216
14	0	none	46	1	243
15	3	1, 49, 1295029	47	6	81, 169, 196, 529, 1681, 250000
16	3	9, 16, 128	48	4	1, 16, 121, 21904
17	7	8, 32, 64, 512, 79507, 140608, 143384152904	49	3	32, 576, 274576
18	3	9, 225, 343	50	0	none
19	5	8, 81, 125, 324, 503284356	51	2	49, 625
20	2	16, 196	52	1	144
21	2	4, 100	53	2	676, 24336
22	2	27, 2187	54	2	27, 289
23	4	4, 9, 121, 2025	55	3	9, 729, 175561
24	5	1, 8, 25, 1000, 542939080312	56	4	8, 25, 169, 5776
25	2	100, 144	57	3	64, 343, 784
26	3	1, 42849, 6436343	58	0	none
27	3	9, 169, 216	59	1	841
28	7	4, 8, 36, 100, 484, 50625, 131044	60	4	4, 196, 2515396, 2535525316
29	1	196	61	2	64, 900
30	1	6859	62	0	none
31	2	1, 225	63	4	1, 81, 961, 183250369
32	4	4, 32, 49, 7744	64	4	36, 64, 225, 512

== See also ==
- Beal's conjecture
- Equation x^{y} = y^{x}
- Fermat–Catalan conjecture
- Mordell curve
- Ramanujan–Nagell equation
- Størmer's theorem
- Tijdeman's theorem
- Thaine's theorem
