= Oostzaan =

- Municipality
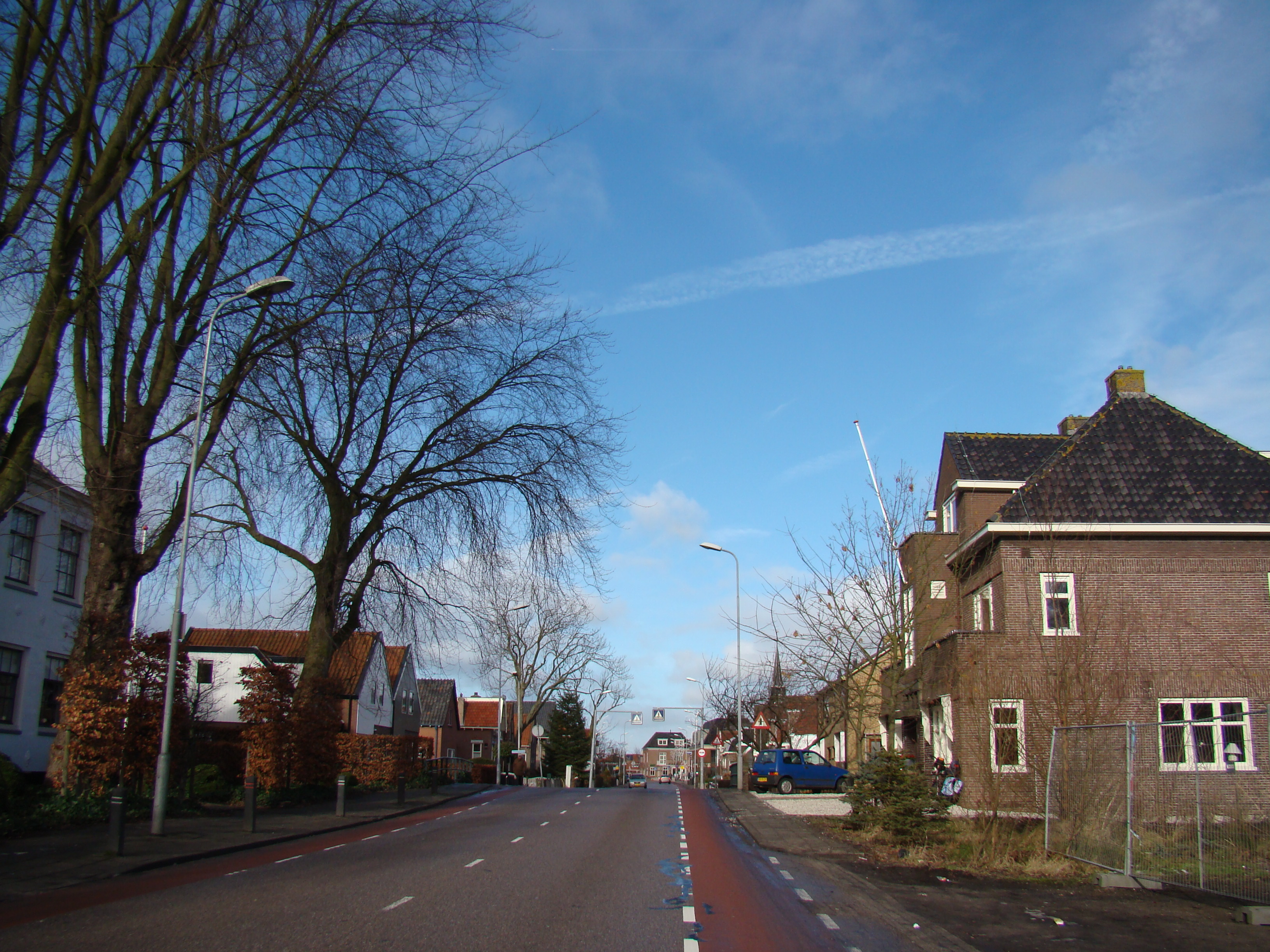
- Street in Oostzaan

- Flag Coat of arms

- Location in North Holland
- Coordinates: 52°26′N 4°53′E
- Country: Netherlands
- Province: North Holland

Government
  - Body: Municipal council
  - Mayor: Marvin Polak (VVD)

Area
  - Total: 16.08 km^{2} (6.21 sq mi)
  - Land: 11.53 km^{2} (4.45 sq mi)
  - Water: 4.55 km^{2} (1.76 sq mi)
- Elevation: 0 m (0 ft)

Population (January 2021)
  - Total: 9,689
  - Density: 840/km^{2} (2,200/sq mi)
- Time zone: UTC+1 (CET)
  - Summer (DST): UTC+2 (CEST)
- Postcode: 1510–1511
- Area code: 075
- Website: www.oostzaan.nl

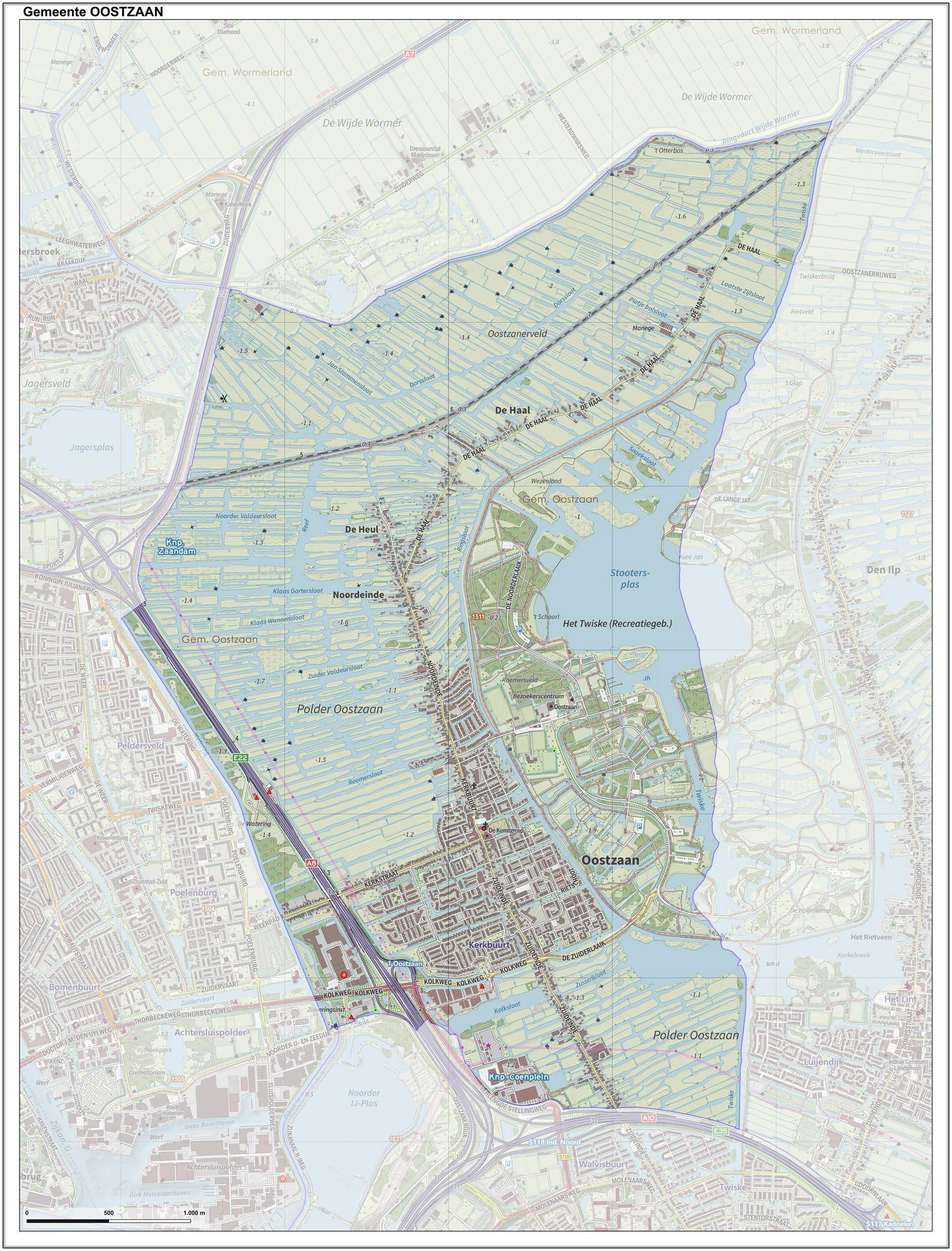
Map of municipality of Oostzaan, 2022

Oostzaan (Dutch pronunciation: [oːstˈsaːn]) is a municipality and a town in the Zaanstreek, Netherlands, in the province of North Holland. The municipality had a population of 9,689 in 2021. Oostzaan has a total area of 16.08 km^{2} (6.21 sq mi) of which 4.55 km^{2} (1.76 sq mi) is water.

Oostzaan—together with Westzaan and Assendelft—are considered the "mother towns" of the Zaanstreek (the region around the River Zaan), of which they are the three oldest towns. Oostzaan also played a role in the VOC and WIC shipping and shipbuilding.

17th century Oostzaan was the home of the pirate Claes Compaen. Originally a privateer for the Dutch Republic, he soon began to act as a pirate, capturing several hundred ships. A street in Oostzaan is named after him.

The town has a Reformed church with a cruciform groundplan, the Great Church (1760), which contains two ship models that recall the days when Oostzaan was an important sea-faring community. In the Oostzijderveld area of Oostzaan stands a windmill, De Windjager (The Wind Hunter).

== Hamlets ==
Oostzaan consists of several hamlets,

- Achterdichting (Get Behind The Seal),
- De Heul,
- Kerkbuurt (church neighborhood),
- Noordeinde (North end),
- Zuideinde (South end).

Kerkbuurt and the northern part of Zuideinde are the center of Oostzaan.

== Local government ==
The municipal council of Oostzaan consists of 13 seats, which at the 2026 municipal elections divided as follows:

- VVD - 6 seats
- CDA - 2 seats
- GroenLinks - 2 seats
- D66 - 2 seats
- PvdA - 1 seat

== Economy ==
The poultry company Meyn Food Processing Technology is headquartered in Oostzaan.

== Notable people ==
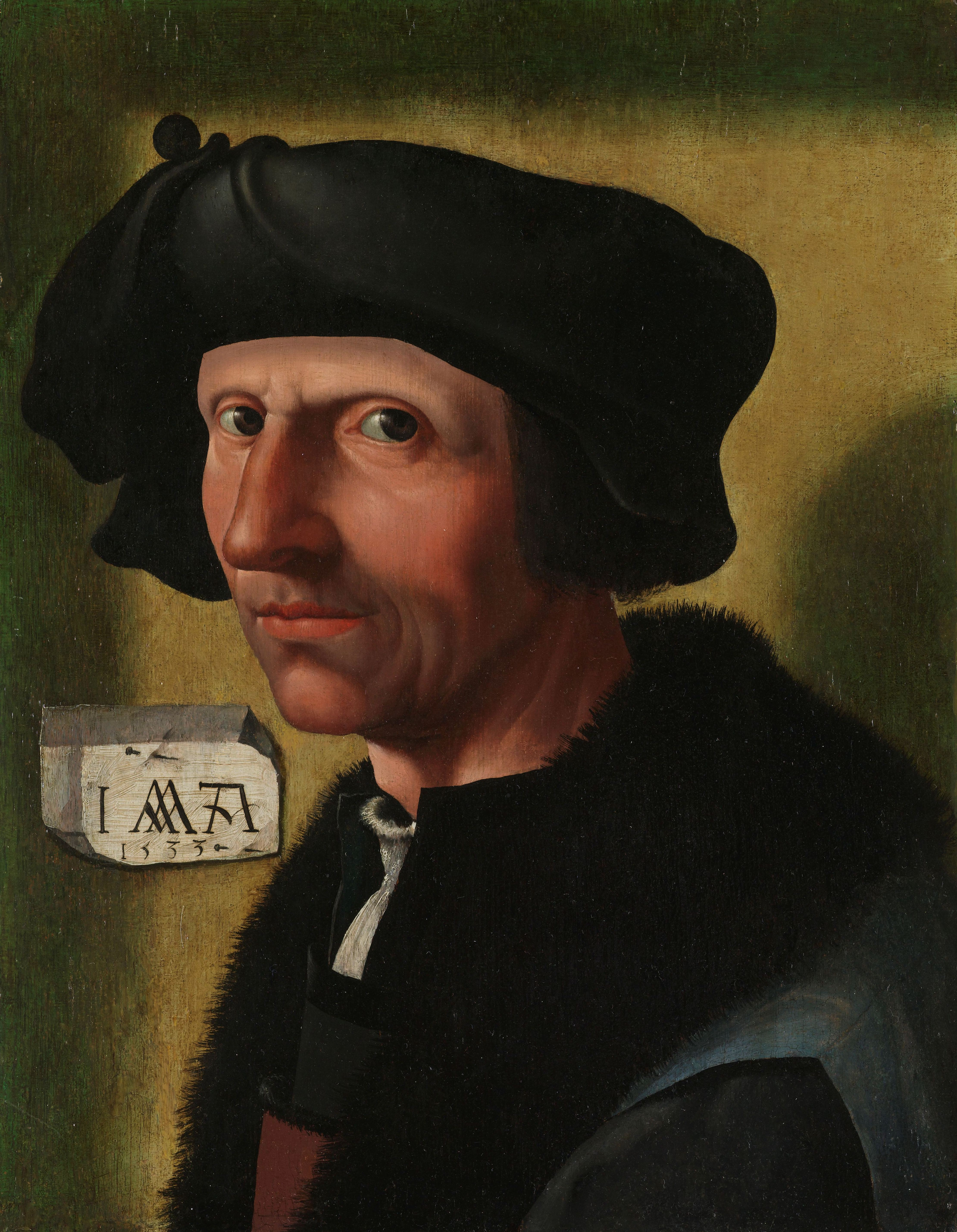
Jacob Cornelisz, self-portrait, 1533

- Jacob Cornelisz van Oostsanen (before 1470 – 1533) a Northern Netherlandish designer of woodcuts and a painter
- Claes Gerritszoon Compaen (1587 in Oostzaan – 1660 in Oostzaan) a corsair, merchant, a privateer for the Dutch Republic and pirate
- Albert Heijn (1865 in Oostzaan – 1945) an entrepreneur who founded Albert Heijn, a Dutch supermarket chain
- Grietje de Jongh (1924 in Oostzaan – 2002) a Dutch sprinter, competed at the 1948 and 1952 Summer Olympics
- Robert Tijdeman (born 1943 in Oostzaan) a mathematician, specializing in number theory, wrote Tijdeman's theorem
- Trijnie Rep (born 1950 in Oostzaan) a Dutch former speed skater, who competed at the 1972 Winter Olympics
- Charles Zwolsman Sr. (1955 in Oostzaan – 2011) a drug dealer and professional racecar driver
- Rosemarijn Dral (born 1985 in Oostzaan) a politician, member of the Dutch House of Representatives since 2024

== Gallery ==
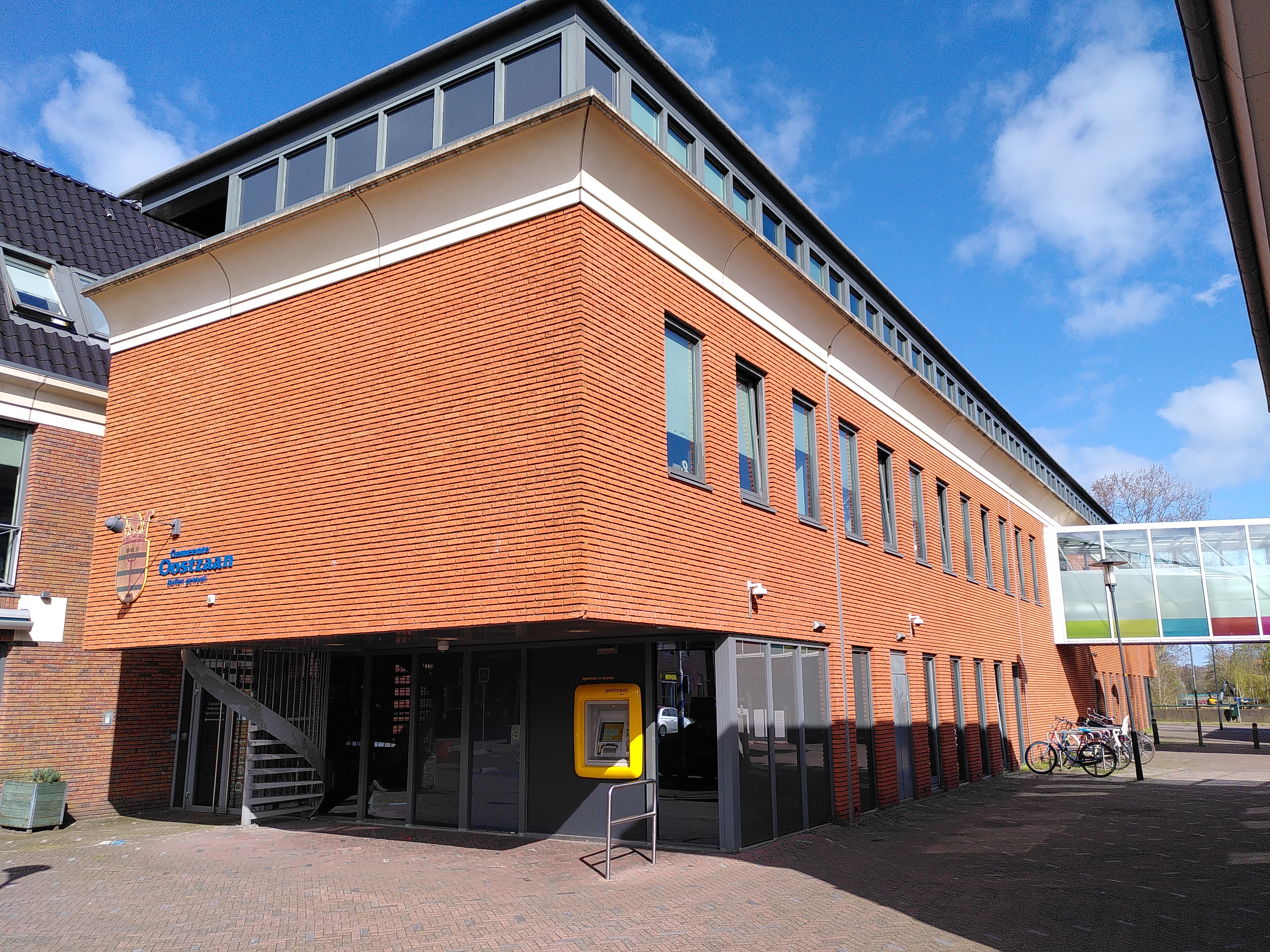
The town hall of Oostzaan

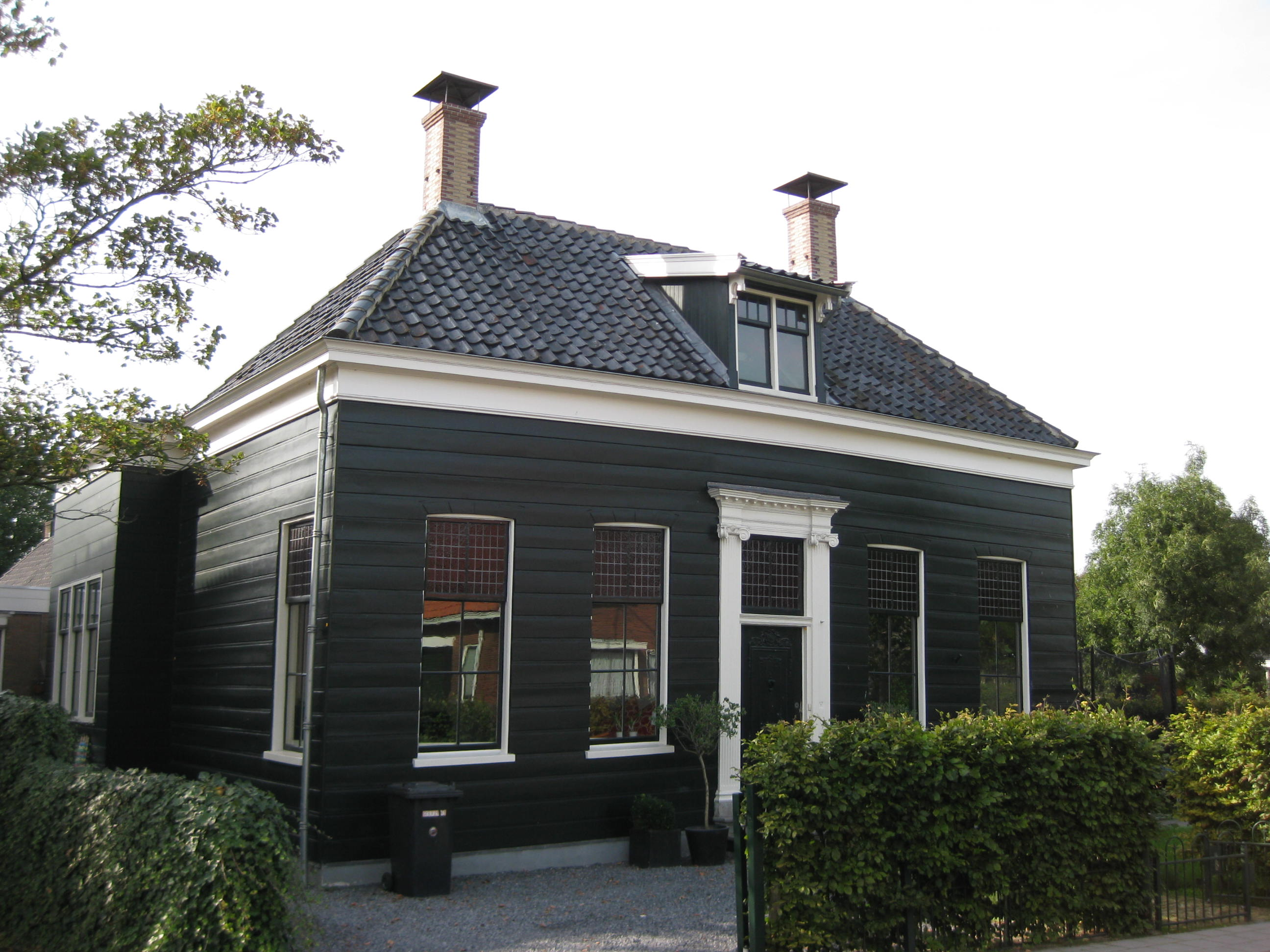
Kerkbuurt 27, Oostzaan

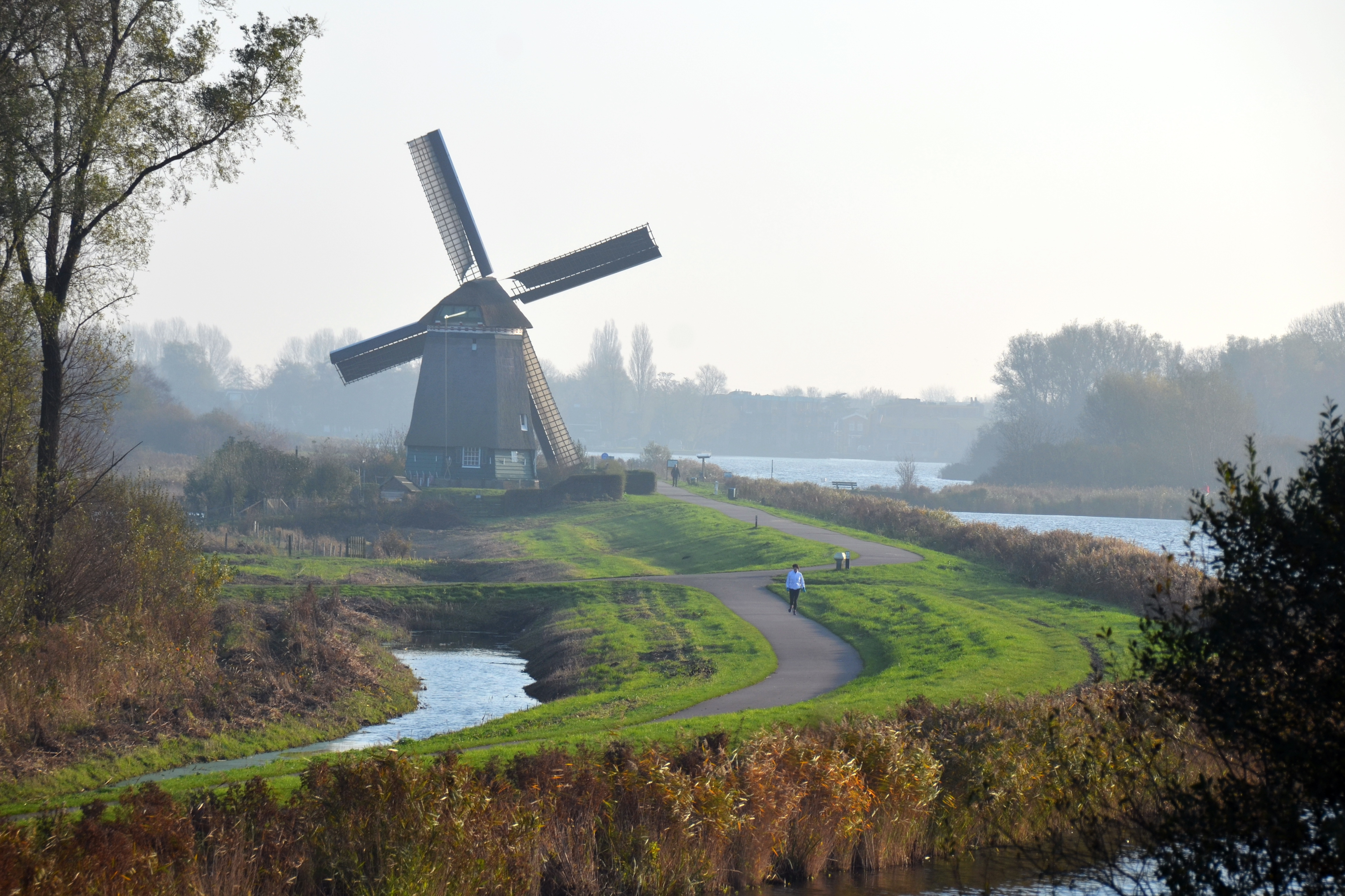
Mill Twiske at Oostzaan

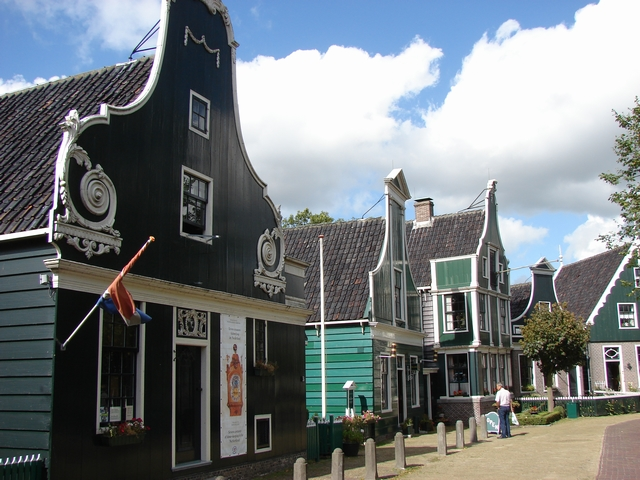
Zaanse schans straote

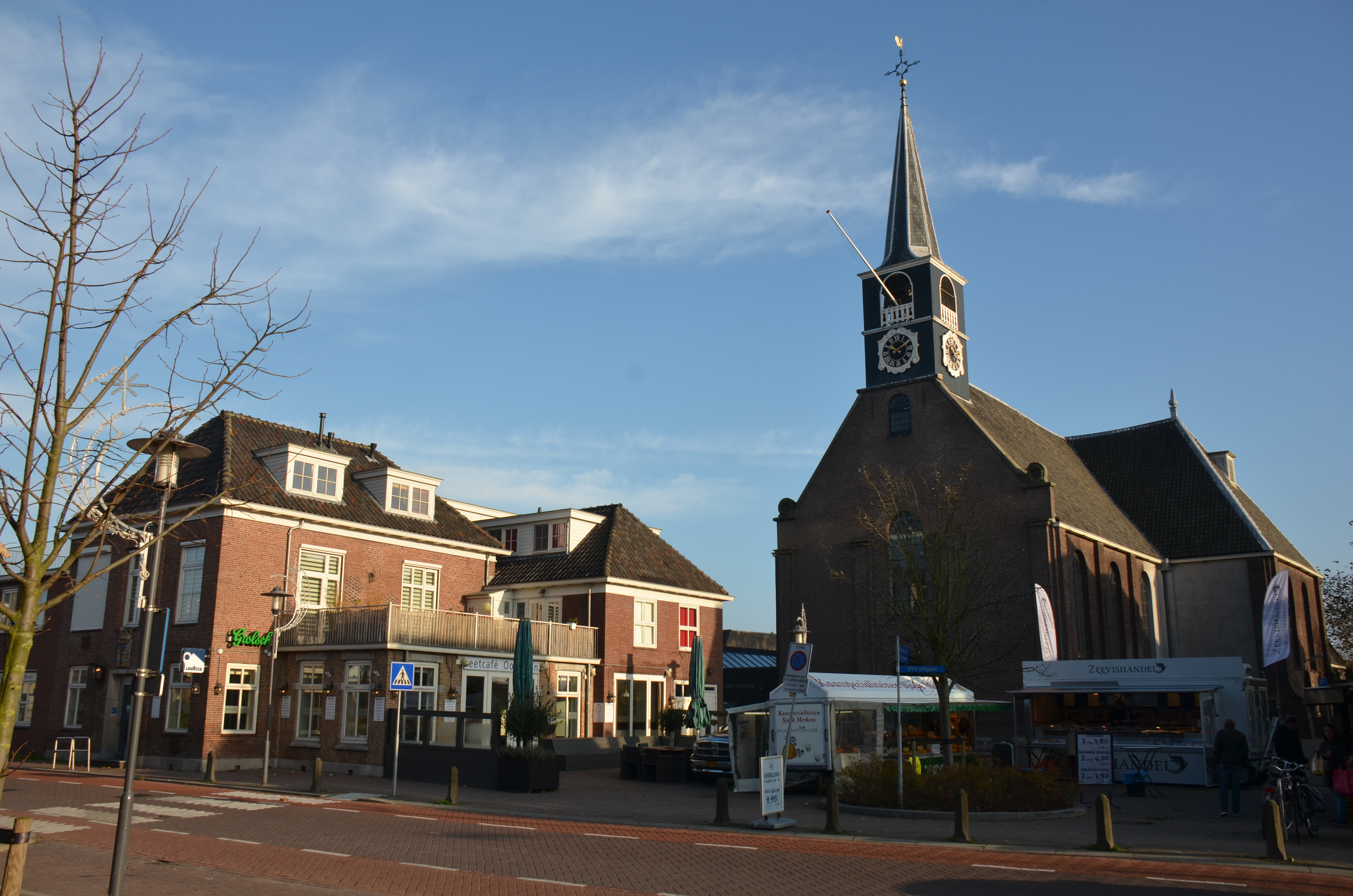
Church in the center of Oostzaan
