= Robert Tijdeman =

Dutch mathematician (born 1943)

- Born: 30 July 1943 (age 83); Oostzaan
- Education: University of Amsterdam
- Known for: Tijdeman's theorem
- Scientific career
- Fields: Mathematics
- Workplaces: Leiden University
- Doctoral advisor: Jan Popken
- Doctoral students: Frits Beukers; Ionica Smeets; Marc Voorhoeve

Robert Tijdeman (born 30 July 1943 in Oostzaan, North Holland) is a Dutch mathematician. Specializing in number theory, he is best known for his Tijdeman's theorem. He is a professor of mathematics at the Leiden University since 1975, and was chairman of the department of mathematics and computer science at Leiden from 1991 to 1993. He was also president of the Royal Dutch Mathematical Society from 1984 to 1986.

Tijdeman received his PhD in 1969 from the University of Amsterdam, and received an honorary doctorate from Kossuth Lajos University in 1999. In 1987 he was elected to the Royal Netherlands Academy of Arts and Sciences.

== Research ==
In number theory, Tijdeman's theorem states that there are at most a finite number of consecutive powers. Stated another way, the set of solutions in integers x, y, n, m of the exponential diophantine equation

$$y^m = x^n + 1,$$

for exponents n and m greater than one, is finite. (This was a significant step towards resolving Catalan’s conjecture, which Preda Mihăilescu accomplished in 2002.)

Tijdeman worked closely with T.N. Shorey on various arithmetic problems. He has also worked on algorithms in the area of discrete tomography.

== Selected publications ==
- Shorey, T. N.; Tijdeman, R. (1990). "On the greatest prime factor of an arithmetical progression". In Baker, A.; Bollobas, B.; Hajnal, A. (eds.). A Tribute to Paul Erdős. Cambridge: Cambridge University Press. pp. 385–390. doi:10.1017/cbo9780511983917.032. ISBN 978-0-511-98391-7.
- Shorey, T.; Tijdeman, R. (11 August 2010). "On the greatest prime factor of an arithmetical progression. II". Acta Arithmetica. 53 (5): 499–504. doi:10.4064/aa-53-5-499-504. ISSN 0065-1036.
- Shorey, T.N.; Tijdeman, R. (1992). "On the greatest prime factor of an arithmetical progression III". In Philippon, Patrice (ed.). Approximations diophantiennes et nombres transcendants: comptes-rendus du colloque tenu au C.I.R.M de Luminy 18-22 juin 1990. Berlin; New York: W. de Gruyter. ISBN 978-3-11-013486-5.
- Shorey, T.N.; Tijdeman, R. (1986). Exponential Diophantine Equations. Cambridge, England: Cambridge University Press. ISBN 978-0521268264. OCLC 13010635.
