= Ionica Smeets =

Dutch blogger, journalist, mathematician, university professor and television presenter

Prof. Dr. Ir. Ionica Smeets
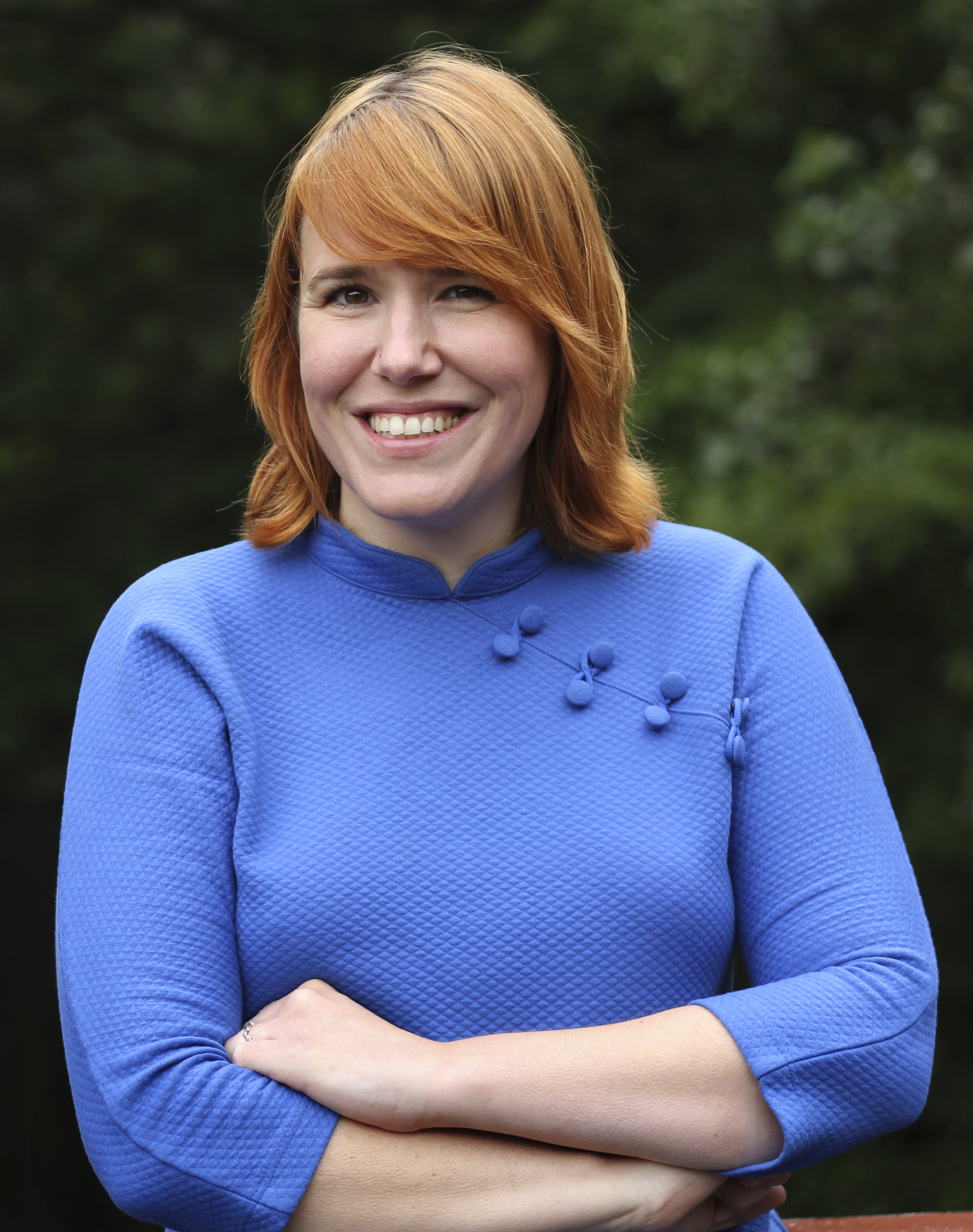
- Ionica Smeets in 2014 (photo: Ype Driessen)
- Born: 8 October 1979 (age 46); Delft
- Known for: Wiskundemeisjes (Dutch Mathematics Blog), Nationale Wetenschapsquiz
- Scientific career
- Fields: Mathematics, science communication

Ionica Smeets (born 8 October 1979) is a Dutch mathematician, science journalist, columnist, television presenter and professor in science communication at Leiden University.

== Biography ==
Ionica Smeets was born in Delft, where she completed her propedeuse in computer science at the Delft University of Technology. She switched studies and graduated in applied mathematics.

Smeets was working on her thesis in mathematics, on a subject within number theory, at Leiden University when she started the blog Wiskundemeisjes ('Math girls'), on 14 March 2006, together with Jeanine Daems. The website has been awarded in 2007 with two Dutch Bloggies. Since 2010, the two 'math girls' ran a column in De Volkskrant for several years. Currently, Smeets writes a weekly piece titled "Ionica zag een getal" ("Ionica saw a number") in the periodical Sir Edmund (a magazine from De Volkskrant).

She completed her PhD at Leiden in 2010; her dissertation, On Continued Fraction Algorithms, was supervised by Robert Tijdeman and Cornelis Kraaikamp. After this, Smeets became a science journalist. She performs research, together with Bas Haring, on successful methods to explain science to the general audience. In this function, she appeared on Dutch television, such as in De Wereld Draait Door. On 19 October 2011, the book Ik was altijd heel slecht in wiskunde (I have always been bad at mathematics) appeared, which she wrote together with Jeanine Daems. Begin 2012, Smeets co-presented eight editions of the KRO-program De Rekenkamer, replacing Sofie van den Enk. In 2013, Smeets presented the mathematics program Eureka, together with Van den Enk. On 17 August 2014 she was guest in the Dutch television program Zomergasten. Furthermore, she participated in the NCRV's television quiz De Slimste Mens in August 2014, almost reaching the final round.

In July 2015, Smeets was appointed professor in Science Communication at the University of Leiden. In December 2015, she started presenting the VPRO television program de Nationale Wetenschapsquiz (the National Science Quiz), which she has presented together with Pieter Hulst up until now.

== Selected publications ==
- Ionica Smeets: Zoete kinderen eten geen suiker. Amsterdam, Uitgeverij Nieuwezijds, 2016. ISBN 978-90-5712-467-9
- Ionica Smeets: Het exacte verhaal. Amsterdam, Nieuwezijds, 2014. ISBN 978-90-571-2393-1
- Jeanine Daems & Ionica Smeets: Ik was altijd heel slecht in wiskunde. Reken maar op de wiskundemeisjes. Amsterdam, Nieuwezijds, 2011. ISBN 978-90-5712-336-8
- Ionica Smeets & Bas Haring: Vallende kwartjes. Een slimme selectie van leesbare wetenschap. Amsterdam, Nijgh & Van Ditmar 2010. 5th print 2012: ISBN 978-90-388-9485-0
- Ionica Smeets: On continued fraction algorithms. Enschede, Ipskamp Drukkers, 2010. (Proefschrift Universiteit Leiden) No ISBN. Digital version
