= Claes Gerritszoon Compaen =

Dutch corsair and merchant (1587–1660)

Claes Compaen
- Born: 1587; Oostzaan, Netherlands
- Died: 1660 (aged 72–73); Oostzaan
- Piratical career
- Type: Corsair, pirate
- Allegiance: Netherlands
- Years active: c. 1621-c. 1627
- Rank: Captain
- Base of operations: Oostzaan; Duinkerken; Duchy of Clare; Salé
- Battles: Eighty Years' War

Claes Gerritszoon Compaen (1587 – 25 February 1660), also called Claas Compaan or Klaas Kompaan, was a 17th-century Dutch corsair and merchant. Dissatisfied as a privateer for the Dutch Republic, he turned to piracy and captured hundreds of ships operating in Europe, the Mediterranean and West Africa during the 1620s.

== Biography ==
=== Early life ===
Born in Oostzaan, his father was an alleged member of the Geuzen of Dirck Duyvel housed in Zaanstreek allied other nobleman in opposition of Spanish rule. Compaen went to sea at an early age and eventually became a successful merchant as a trader along the coast of Guinea. He later used the profits from these voyages to refit his ships for privateering activities against the Spanish. Based from Oostende and Duinkerken, he was initially successful capturing several Spanish prizes within a short period of time, however, several of the ships were later released by Dutch authorities. One of these captured ships was over 200 tons, fitted with 17 guns and manned by a crew of 80 men.

=== Piratical career ===
Compaen used a plain blue flag when attacking vessels.

Sometime around 1621, he left port with a letter of marque from the Dutch Admiralty leaving them to pay his debt of 8,000 gilders to the widow of Medemblik ship owner Captain Pieter Gerritszoon, from whom he had purchased his ship. He soon stopped a fishing boat, taking its cargo of herring and salted fish, and used letter of credit issued by Dutch authorities although the Admiralty refused to compensate the fishermen. He seized the cargo of another ship before taking shelter in Vlissingen from an approaching storm. While in port, he took on 50 additional crew members. Shortly after leaving Vlissingen, he resorted to open and indiscriminate piracy selling his cargo in England and the Barbary coast.

In 1625, he began operating from the Duchy of Clare. He was a close friend of the local governor as well as the Thomas Wentworth, 1st Earl of Strafford and freely operated in the Irish Sea and the English Channel under their protection for some time. Compaen later turned up in the Mediterranean, selling captured ships and their cargo at the Moroccan ports of Saffi, Mogador and Salé.

While at Salé, he sold most of his prizes (over 300 ships in his career) to Simon the Dancer, Jr., son of the famed Dutch privateer Simon the Dancer who had been active in the area during the previous decade. The heavy costs of dealing with him eventually caused Compaen to do business with his chief rival Jan Janszoon. This caused a major disagreement, with Simon sending a fleet to attack him while at port. Compaen was warned of the attack ahead of time and was able to successfully defeat the attackers as well as capture one of Simon's ships. During the raid, Simon's flagship was reportedly so badly damaged it was forced to retreat from the battle. Following this defeat, Simon was forced to leave Salé seeking asylum in the Dutch Republic. Receiving a pardon from the Netherlands, he eventually became a corsair himself.

=== Battle with the Hollandia ===
In 1626 Compaen began looking to request a pardon from the Dutch so as to return to his homeland. On 5 July two ships belonging to the Dutch East India Company were sighted. These ships, the Hollandia and the smaller yacht Grootenbroek, had been separate from the main fleet which had gone ahead to the Verdian Isles without them while the Hollandia was escorted to Sierra Leone to repair a leak (another account claims it stopped to stock up on limes for its crew suffering from scurvy). Compaen ordered his four ships to attack the stragglers although he was forced to withdraw after his flagship suffered severe damage from the Hollandia under Captain Wybrant Schram. Seventy of his men had also been killed in battle. When Schram's logbook was later published, Compaen gained particular notoriety from the battle whose reputation was established as "the most notorious Dutch pirate".

With his other three ships guarding the harbor, both protecting the flagship and preventing the two East India ships from leaving, Compaen managed to sail his ship into Sierra Leone for repairs. Although tensions were high between the two parties while in port, he left peacefully with his fleet once repairs had been completed. The Hollandia and the Grootenbroek were allowed to leave and eventually arrived in Batavia in December 1626.

=== Pardon and later years ===
Compaen, at certain times, often found it difficult to control his large crew who were given to heavy drinking and survived on poor rations being short of supplies. In one incident, he attacked a Spanish settlement because his fleet were running low on provisions. He and his crew were unable to defeat the Spanish defenders however and ended up retreating with heavy losses. While sailing along the Spanish coast, he also encountered the pirate Colaert of Duinkerken. Despite his fleet being outnumbered 4 to 1, he was able to escape from the stronger Colaert.

In 1626 or 1627, Compaen returned to Salé with a number of recently captured prizes. While there, he was told he had been granted a pardon from the Netherlands. He sailed immediately for home, only four days before a Dutch fleet arrived looking to apprehend him.

After dropping off part of his crew elsewhere in Ireland, he called at Killybegs in April 1627 to reprovision. In a 28 April 1627 letter to Sir Basil Brooke, Governor of Donegal, Compaen stated that he already held "a pardon from the States of Holland and protection from the King of England" and promised to "do no damage but merely require provisions for which I will pay largely." Local reports indicate his crew spent more than £1,000 there. Brooke ordered High Constable James Hamilton and his brother, minister William Hamilton, to arrest Compaen and seize his goods, though they lacked sufficient manpower to carry out the order.

Compaen then sailed home around the north of Scotland, made landfall at Vlie, and officially received his pardon from Prince Frederik Hendrik in the Hague. He apparently found less success in his later years, eventually dying a pauper in Oostzaan on 25 February 1660.

A biography on his piratical career, The Life of Claes G. Compaen, was published in Amsterdam by De Groot in 1715.
