= CTB International =

American agricultural machinery manufacturer

CTB, Inc.
- Type: Subsidiary
- Industry: Manufacturing
- Founded: 1952; 74 years ago
- Headquarters: Milford, Indiana, U.S.
- Area served: Worldwide
- Key people: Victor A. Mancinelli (chairman and CEO)
- Products: Agricultural equipment Egg production equipment Food processing equipment Food traceability software Grain preservation equipment Pork production equipment Poultry production equipment Precision molded plastic components Grain silos
- Number of employees: Approx. 3000
- Parent: Berkshire Hathaway
- Website: www.ctbinc.com

CTB, Inc. is a global designer and manufacturer of systems for preserving grain, producing poultry, pigs and eggs, and processing food and a subsidiary of Berkshire Hathaway. The company is headquartered in Milford, Indiana, and employs approximately 3,000 people worldwide.

== History ==
The company was initially founded under the name Chore-Time Equipment in 1952, manufacturing poultry, egg and pig production equipment. In 1957, the sister company of Brock Grain Systems was founded, focusing on grain storage. Using the initials of both companies, the brands incorporated under the CTB name in 1976.

On August 19, 2002, CTB International Corp signed a merger agreement with Berkshire Hathaway Inc. CTB became a wholly owned subsidiary of Berkshire Hathaway once the transaction was complete on October 31, 2002.

== Acquisitions ==
CTB, Inc., has expanded through acquisitions both before and since becoming a subsidiary of Berkshire Hathaway.

In 2006, CTB bought a controlling interest in AgroLogic, an Israeli company that makes climate control and weighing systems for agricultural use. In 2010, CTB bought Ironwood Plastics, a Michigan-based producer of plastic components used for automobile, military and industrial applications. The goal of the acquisition was to add capabilities in the plastics segment with the intention of benefitting all CTB business units.

In May 2012, CTB acquired Meyn Holdings, owners of Meyn Food Processing Technology, a Dutch firm that manufactures machines used by poultry integrators to process poultry.

CTB purchased Martin Industries Corp. in December 2012. Martin and its subsidiaries, including Des Moines, Iowa-based LeMar Industries, manufacture bucket elevators, grain conveyors, grain facility structures and other devices for loading and unloading crops from storage.

CTB purchased Holding Hamon Development, a designer and manufacturer of buildings for the poultry industry, in February 2016. This is the parent company of Serupa SAS, which makes buildings for meat-processing and poultry storage.

In September 2016, CTB acquired a majority stake of Cabinplant, a Danish food processing equipment supplier with subsidiaries in Poland, Germany, Spain and the U.S.

== Primary Brands ==
- AgroLogic
- Brock
- Cabinplant
- CAT Squared
- Chore-Time
- Fancom
- Ironwood Plastics
- Laake
- LeMar Industries
- Meyn
- PigTek
- Roxell
- Serupa
