= Tarlok Nath Shorey =

Indian scientist

- Born: 30 October 1945 (age 80)
- Education: Panjab University, Tata Institute of Fundamental Research
- Awards: Shanti Swarup Bhatnagar Prize for Science and Technology
- Scientific career
- Fields: Theory of numbers
- Workplaces: IIT Bombay, Tata Institute of Fundamental Research

Tarlok Nath Shorey is an Indian mathematician who specialises in theory of numbers. He is currently a distinguished professor in the department of mathematics at IIT Bombay. Previously, he worked at TIFR.

He was awarded in 1987 the Shanti Swarup Bhatnagar Prize for Science and Technology, the highest science award in India, in the mathematical sciences category. Shorey has done significant work on transcendental number theory, in particular best estimates for linear forms in logarithms of algebraic numbers. He has obtained some new applications of Baker’s method to Diophantine equations and Ramanujan’s T-function. Shorey's contribution to irreducibility of Laguerre polynomials is extensive.

== Selected publications ==
- — (1974). "On gaps between numbers with a large prime factor. II". Acta Arithmetica. 25 (4): 365–373. ISSN 0065-1036.
- —; Tijdeman, R. (1986). Exponential Diophantine Equations. Cambridge Tracts in Mathematics. Vol. 87. Cambridge: Cambridge University Press. ISBN 978-0-521-26826-4. OCLC 13010635. Zbl 0606.10011.
- —; Tijdeman, R. (1990). "On the greatest prime factor of an arithmetical progression". In Baker, Alan; Bollobás, Béla; Hajnal, András (eds.). A Tribute to Paul Erdős. Cambridge: Cambridge University Press. pp. 385–389. doi:10.1017/CBO9780511983917.032. ISBN 978-0-521-38101-7.
- —; Tijdeman, R. (1990). "On the greatest prime factor of an arithmetical progression. II". Acta Arithmetica. 53 (5): 499–504. ISSN 0065-1036.
- —; Tijdeman, R. (1992). "On the greatest prime factor of an arithmetical progression. III". In Philippon, Patrice (ed.). Approximations diophantiennes et nombres transcendants: comptes-rendus du colloque tenu au C.I.R.M. de Luminy, 18–22 juin 1990. Berlin: Walter de Gruyter. pp. 275–280. ISBN 978-3-11-013486-5.
- — (2020). Complex Analysis with Applications to Number Theory. Infosys Science Foundation Series in Mathematical Sciences. Singapore: Springer. doi:10.1007/978-981-15-9097-9. ISBN 978-981-15-9096-2.
