= Commuting probability =

Probability that two elements of a group commute

In mathematics and more precisely in group theory, the commuting probability (also called degree of commutativity or commutativity degree) of a finite group is the probability that two randomly chosen elements commute. It can be used to measure how close to abelian a finite group is. It can be generalized to infinite groups equipped with a suitable probability measure, and can also be generalized to other algebraic structures such as rings.

== Definition ==
Let $G$ be a finite group. We define $p(G)$ as the averaged number of pairs of elements of $G$ which commute:

$$p(G) := \frac{1}{\# G^2} \#\!\left\{ (x,y) \in G^2 \mid xy=yx \right\}$$

where $\# X$ denotes the cardinality of a finite set $X$.

If one considers the uniform distribution on $G^2$, $p(G)$ is the probability that two randomly chosen elements of $G$ commute. That is why $p(G)$ is called the commuting probability of $G$.

== Results ==
- The finite group $G$ is abelian if and only if $p(G) = 1$.
- One has

$$p(G) = \frac{k(G)}{\# G}$$

where $k(G)$ is the number of conjugacy classes of $G$.

- If $G$ is not abelian then $p(G) \leq 5/8$ (this result is sometimes called the 5/8 theorem) and this upper bound is sharp: there are infinitely many finite groups $G$ such that $p(G) = 5/8$, the smallest one being the dihedral group of order 8.
- There is no uniform lower bound on $p(G)$. In fact, for every positive integer $n$ there exists a finite group $G$ such that $p(G) = 1/n$.
- If $G$ is not abelian but simple, then $p(G) \leq 1/12$ (this upper bound is attained by $\mathfrak{A}_5$, the alternating group of degree 5).
- The set of commuting probabilities of finite groups is reverse-well-ordered, and the reverse of its order type is $\omega^\omega$.

== Generalizations ==
- The commuting probability can be defined for other algebraic structures such as finite rings. The 5/8 theorem also applies to finite rings.
- The commuting probability can be defined for infinite compact groups; the probability measure is then, after a renormalisation, the Haar measure.
