= Meyn Food Processing Technology =

Meyn Food Processing Technology B.V.
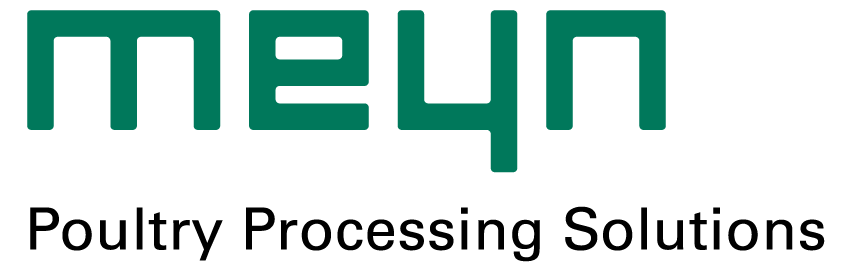

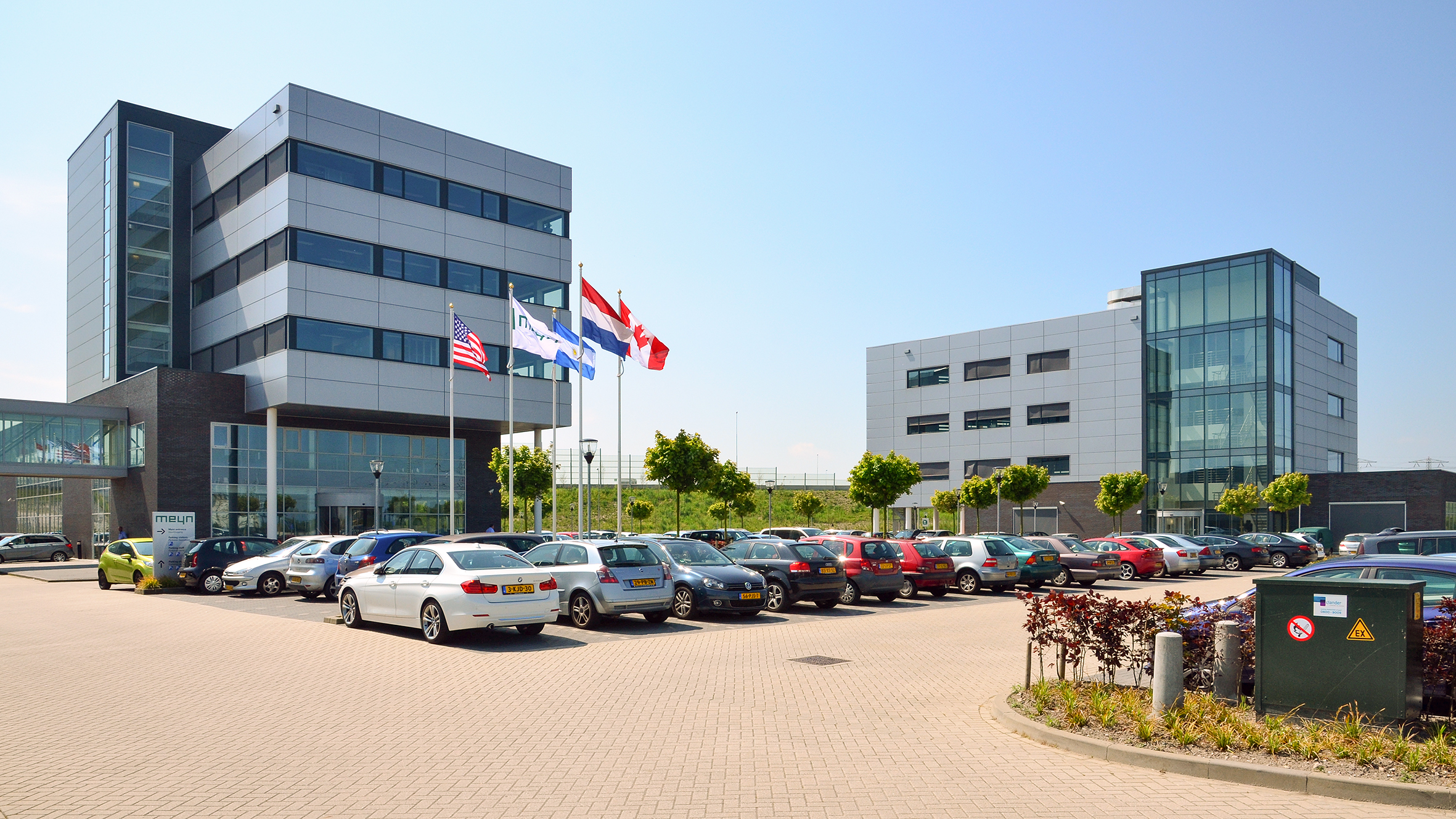
- Meyn's head office in the Netherlands
- Company type: Corporation
- Industry: Manufacture of machinery for food processing; ISIC C2825
- Founded: 1959; 67 years ago in Oostzaan, Netherlands
- Founder: Piet Meijn, Cor Koning
- Headquarters: Oostzaan, Netherlands
- Number of locations: 14 offices
- Area served: Worldwide
- Number of employees: >1000
- Parent: CTB International
- Website: www.meyn.com

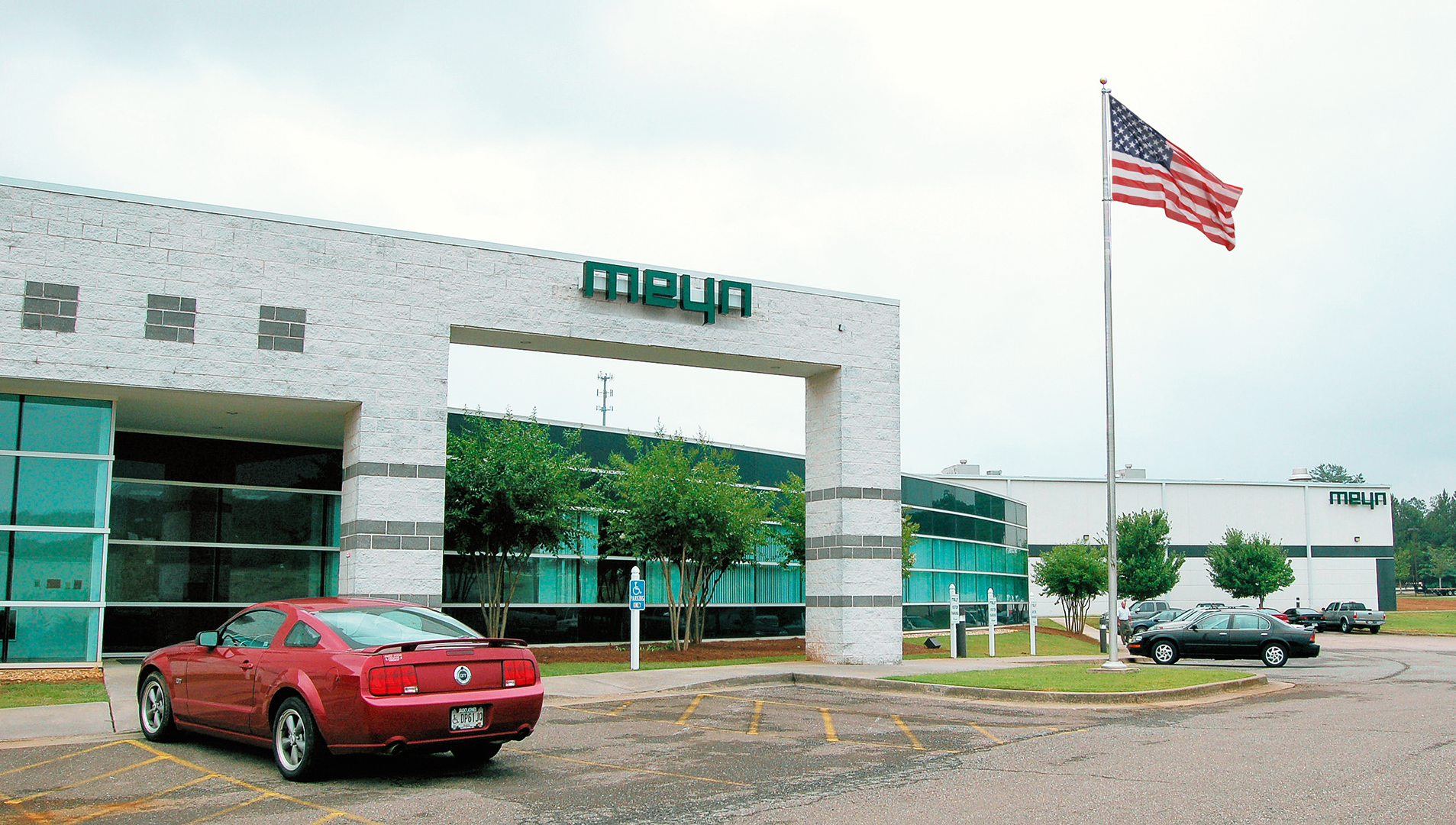
The office of Meyn in Georgia, United States

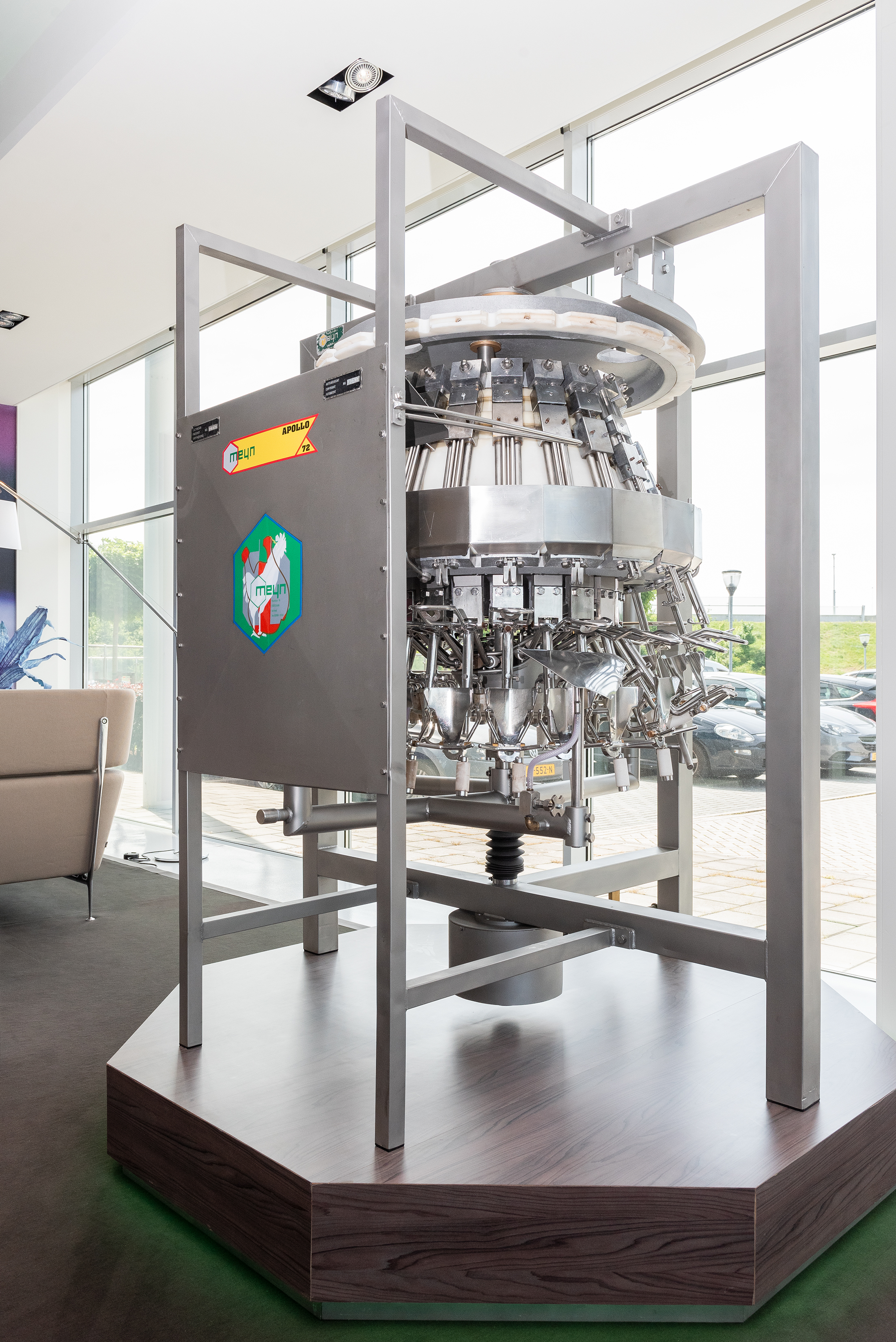
The Apollo eviscerator, developed by Meyn and launched onto the market in 1972

Meyn Food Processing Technology (or simply Meyn) is a supplier of poultry processing services. The principal activity of Meyn is the manufacturing of poultry processing equipment for poultry processing plants. They operate in over ninety countries worldwide and on all continents including Europe, North America, Latin America, Asia, and Africa. They employ approximately 1,000 people and have a network of 14 sales offices. Its head office is in Oostzaan, the Netherlands.

On 31 July 2012, Meyn was taken over by CTB, Inc. (CTB), a subsidiary of Berkshire Hathaway Inc, a designer, manufacturer and marketer of agricultural systems and solutions.

== History ==
Meyn was founded in Oostzaan, the Netherlands, in 1959 by Piet Meijn and Cor Koning. The poultry processing industry is deeply rooted in the region of Oostzaan, where the company developed its first machine to break eggs. It soon followed with the development of machinery to process poultry as a response to increasing local wages.

Following various earlier changes of ownership, Meyn was acquired by Altor Funds (Altor) in 2005. Under its new ownership, the company grew to become the world market leader in this sector, with a turnover of more than 200 million euros. They expanded their business to more than 90 countries and built factories in the United States and Poland. The share of new projects being sold to emerging markets rose substantially while the total workforce doubled from 500 to 1,000 people. In 2012, Altor reached an agreement with CTB, a subsidiary of Berkshire Hathaway Inc, on the sale of Meyn to them. The acquisition was announced by CTB on May 4 of that year.

== Products ==
The company manufactures poultry processing equipment for commercial birds, mainly broilers.
