= Natalia Kliewer =

Kyrgyz-German operations researcher

Natalia Kliewer is a Kyrgyz-German computer scientist and operations researcher who holds the chair of information systems as a professor of business informatics at the Free University of Berlin. The focus of her research is optimization for transport scheduling.

Kliewer is originally from Kyrgyzstan. After studying information systems at the Kyrgyz Technical University and business informatics at the University of Münster, she continued her studies at Paderborn University, where she completed a PhD in 2005. Her dissertation, Optimierung des Fahrzeugeinsatzes im öffentlichen Personennahverkehr : Modelle, Methoden und praktische Anwendungen, was supervised by Leena Suhl. She continued at Paderborn as a junior professor until moving to her present position at the Free University of Berlin in 2009.
