= Tijdeman's theorem =

There are at most a finite number of consecutive powers

In number theory, Tijdeman's theorem states that there are at most a finite number of consecutive powers. Stated another way, the set of solutions in integers x, y, n, m of the exponential diophantine equation

$$y^m = x^n + 1,$$

for exponents n and m greater than one, is finite.

== History ==
The theorem was proven by Dutch number theorist Robert Tijdeman in 1976, making use of Baker's method in transcendental number theory to give an effective upper bound for x,y,m,n. Michel Langevin computed a value of exp exp exp exp 730 for the bound.

Tijdeman's theorem provided a strong impetus towards the eventual proof of Catalan's conjecture by Preda Mihăilescu. Mihăilescu's theorem states that there is only one member of the set of consecutive power pairs, namely 9=8+1.

== Generalized Tijdeman problem ==
That the powers are consecutive is essential to Tijdeman's proof; if we replace the difference of 1 by any other difference k and ask for the number of solutions of

$$y^m = x^n + k$$

with n and m greater than one we have an unsolved problem, called the generalized Tijdeman problem. It is conjectured that this set also will be finite. This would follow from a yet stronger conjecture of Subbayya Sivasankaranarayana Pillai (1931), see Catalan's conjecture, stating that the equation $A y^m = B x^n + k$ only has a finite number of solutions. The truth of Pillai's conjecture, in turn, would follow from the truth of the abc conjecture.
