= RailCab =

Coordinates: 51°42′19″N 8°46′04″E

RailCab is a research project by the University of Paderborn, Germany. Its purpose is the examination of the use of linear engines for the propulsion of autonomous, rail mounted vehicles. Similar to the Transrapid the coaches are moved by linear motors, which have a very low need for maintenance. In contrast to Transrapid a magnetic field is only used for acceleration, the vehicles run on wheels on tracks. This concept allows for modification of existing conventional railway tracks.

== Overview ==
The cabs can be ordered via cell-phone or the internet, and will be configured accordingly to the demands of the customer. In comparison to usual trains these vehicles are means of individual transport. Neither big stations, timetables nor prescribed routes are needed. An important feature is the creation of convoys of several cars with up to 10 passengers on the most frequently used tracks. The cars are not connected, but drive with low distance from each other. This reduces drag and so saves energy. Electronic systems and computers ensure that the cars maintain a certain distance from each other, and organize a fluent transport.

== Experimental track ==
An experimental track exists near Paderborn, which allows the evaluation of the system.
