= Cliff Kliewer =

Canadian football player

Profile
- Position: Halfback

Personal information
- Born: December 29, 1927; Winnipeg, Manitoba, Canada
- Died: July 8, 1987 (aged 59); Kelowna, British Columbia, Canada
- Listed height: 5 ft 10 in (1.78 m)
- Listed weight: 176 lb (80 kg)

Career history
- 1948–1952: Calgary Stampeders

Awards and highlights
- Grey Cup champion (1948)

Clifford John Kliewer (December 29, 1927 – July 8, 1987) was a Canadian professional football player who played for the Calgary Stampeders. He won the Grey Cup with the Stampeders in 1948. The son of John and Ellen Kliewer, he previously played junior football in Winnipeg, Manitoba. He died in 1987 of heart disease.
