= Erwin Engeler =

Swiss mathematician (1930–2026)

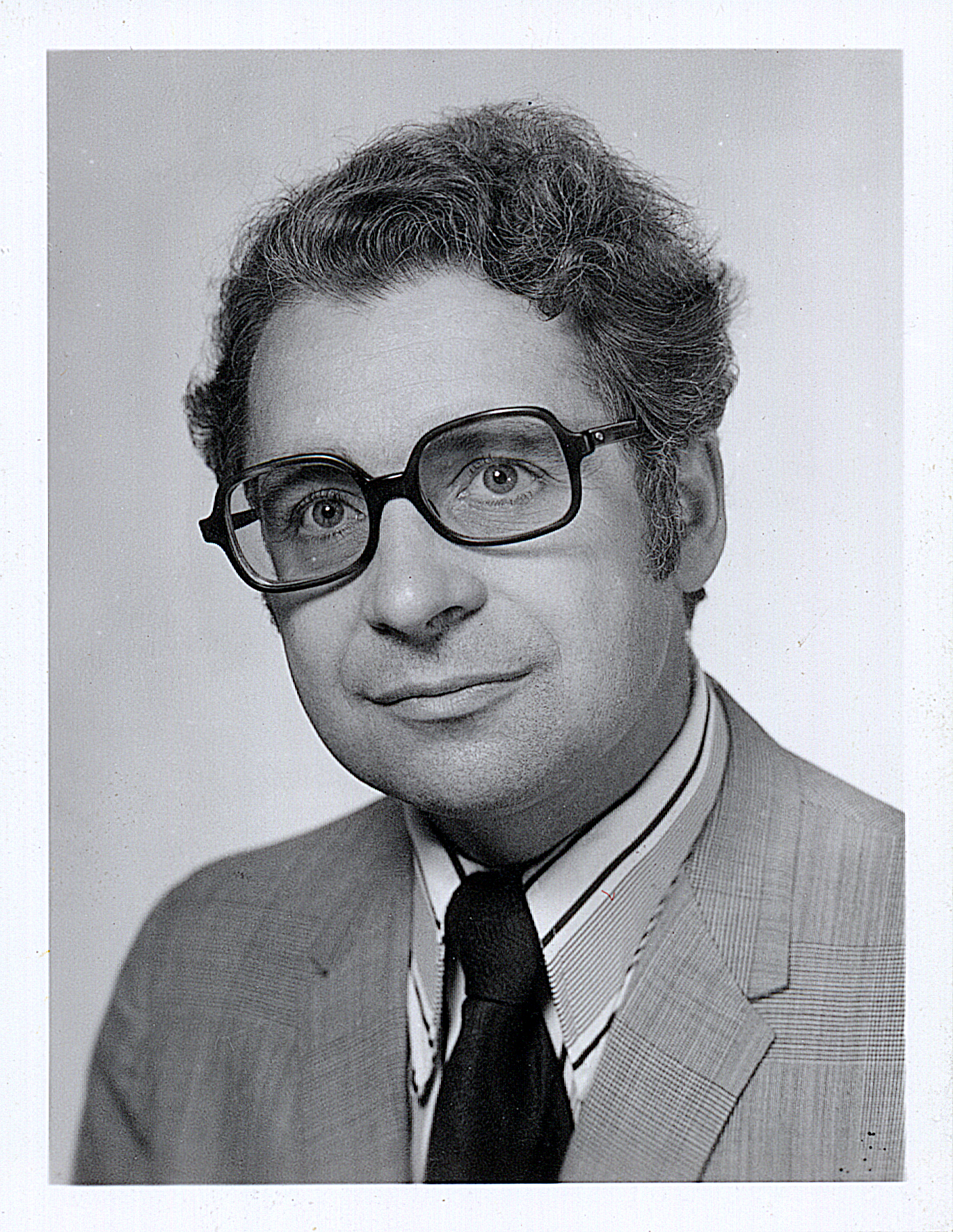
Engeler ca. 1975

Erwin Engeler (13 February 1930 – 28 July 2026) was a Swiss mathematician who did pioneering work on the interrelations between logic, computer science and scientific computation in the 20th century. He was one of Paul Bernays' students at the ETH Zürich.

== Life and career ==
After completing his doctorate in 1958, Engeler spent fourteen years in the United States, teaching at the University of Minnesota and at the University of California, Berkeley. In 1959 he contributed an independent proof of several equivalent conditions to omega-categoricity, an important concept in model theory. He returned to Switzerland in 1972, where he served as a professor of logic and computer science at the ETH until his retirement in 1997.

Engeler was named a Fellow of the Association for Computing Machinery in 1995.

Engeler died on 28 July 2026, at the age of 96.

== Selected publications ==
- Engeler, Erwin (1993). Algorithmic Properties of Structures: Selected Papers of Erwin Engeler. World Scientific. ISBN 978-981-02-0872-1.
