= Commutative property =

Property of some mathematical operations

- Type: Property
- Field: Algebra
- Statement: A binary operation is commutative if changing the order of the operands does not change the result.
- Symbolic statement: $x * y = y * x \quad\forall x,y\in S.$

In mathematics, a binary operation is commutative if changing the order of the operands does not change the result. It is a fundamental property of many binary operations, and many mathematical proofs depend on it. Perhaps most familiar as a property of arithmetic, e.g. "3 + 4 = 4 + 3" or "2 × 5 = 5 × 2", the property can also be used in more advanced settings. The name is needed because there are operations, such as division and subtraction, that do not have it (for example, "3 − 5 ≠ 5 − 3"); such operations are not commutative, and so are referred to as noncommutative operations.

The idea that simple operations, such as the multiplication and addition of numbers, are commutative was for many centuries implicitly assumed. Thus, this property was not named until the 19th century, when new algebraic structures started to be studied.

== Definition ==
A binary operation $*$ on a set S is commutative if
$$x * y = y * x$$
for all $x,y \in S$. An operation that is not commutative is said to be noncommutative.

One says that x commutes with y or that x and y commute under $*$ if
$$x * y = y * x.$$

So, an operation is commutative if every two elements commute. An operation is noncommutative if there are two elements such that $x * y \ne y * x.$ This does not exclude the possibility that some pairs of elements commute.

== Examples ==
The cumulation of apples, which can be seen as an addition of natural numbers, is commutative.

=== Commutative operations ===
The addition of vectors is commutative, because $\vec a+\vec b=\vec b+ \vec a.$

- Addition and multiplication are commutative in most number systems, and, in particular, between natural numbers, integers, rational numbers, real numbers and complex numbers. This is also true in every field.
- Addition is commutative in every vector space and in every algebra.
- Union and intersection are commutative operations on sets.
- "And" and "or" are commutative logical operations.

=== Noncommutative operations ===
- Division is noncommutative, since $1 \div 2 \neq 2 \div 1$. Subtraction is noncommutative, since $0 - 1 \neq 1 - 0$. However it is classified more precisely as anti-commutative, since $x - y = - (y - x)$ for every $x$ and $y$. Exponentiation is noncommutative, since $2^3\neq3^2$ (see Equation x^{y} = y^{x}).
- Some truth functions are noncommutative, since their truth tables are different when one changes the order of the operands. For example, the truth tables for (A ⇒ B) = (¬A ∨ B) and (B ⇒ A) = (A ∨ ¬B) are
  A	B	A ⇒ B	B ⇒ A
  F	F	T	T
  F	T	T	F
  T	F	F	T
  T	T	T	T
- Function composition is generally noncommutative. For example, if $f(x)=2x+1$ and $g(x)=3x+7$. Then
  $$(f \circ g)(x) = f(g(x)) = 2(3x+7)+1 = 6x+15$$
  and
  $$(g \circ f)(x) = g(f(x)) = 3(2x+1)+7 = 6x+10.$$
- Matrix multiplication of square matrices of a given dimension is a noncommutative operation, except for $1\times 1$ matrices. For example:
  $$\begin{bmatrix}
0 & 2 \\
0 & 1
\end{bmatrix} =
\begin{bmatrix}
1 & 1 \\
0 & 1
\end{bmatrix}
\begin{bmatrix}
0 & 1 \\
0 & 1
\end{bmatrix} \neq
\begin{bmatrix}
0 & 1 \\
0 & 1
\end{bmatrix}
\begin{bmatrix}
1 & 1 \\
0 & 1
\end{bmatrix} =
\begin{bmatrix}
0 & 1 \\
0 & 1
\end{bmatrix}$$
- The vector product (or cross product) of two vectors in three dimensions is anti-commutative; i.e., $\mathbf{b} \times \mathbf{a} = -(\mathbf{a} \times \mathbf{b})$.
- The quaternion multiplication is noncommutative, since $\mathbf {ij}= -\mathbf {ji}$, where $\mathbf i$ and $\mathbf j$ are two of the basis quaternions.

== Commutative structures ==
Some types of algebraic structures involve an operation that does not require commutativity. If this operation is commutative for a specific structure, the structure is often said to be commutative. So,

- a commutative semigroup is a semigroup whose operation is commutative;
- a commutative monoid is a monoid whose operation is commutative;
- a commutative group or abelian group is a group whose operation is commutative;
- a commutative ring is a ring whose multiplication is commutative. (Addition in a ring is always commutative.)

However, in the case of algebras, the phrase "commutative algebra" refers only to associative algebras that have a commutative multiplication.

== History and etymology ==
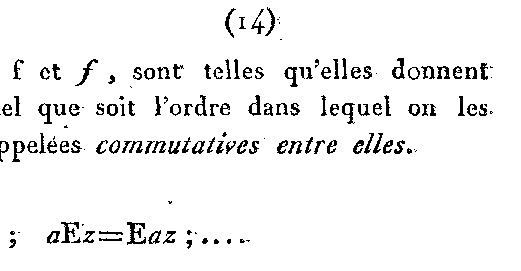
The first known use of the term was in a French Journal published in 1814

Records of the implicit use of the commutative property go back to ancient times. The Egyptians used the commutative property of multiplication to simplify computing products. Euclid is known to have assumed the commutative property of multiplication in his book Elements. Formal uses of the commutative property arose in the late 18th and early 19th centuries when mathematicians began to work on a theory of functions. Nowadays, the commutative property is a well-known and basic property used in most branches of mathematics.

The first recorded use of the term commutative was in a memoir by François Servois in 1814, which used the word commutatives when describing functions that have what is now called the commutative property. Commutative is the feminine form of the French adjective commutatif, which is derived from the French noun commutation and the French verb commuter, meaning "to exchange" or "to switch", a cognate of to commute. The term then appeared in English in 1838 in Duncan Gregory's article entitled "On the real nature of symbolical algebra" published in 1840 in the Transactions of the Royal Society of Edinburgh.

== See also ==
- Anticommutative property
- Canonical commutation relation (in quantum mechanics)
- Centralizer and normalizer (also called a commutant)
- Commutative diagram
- Commutative (neurophysiology)
- Commutator
- Commuting graph
- Commuting probability
- Particle statistics (for commutativity in physics)
- Quasi-commutative property
- Symmetric function (a binary operation is commutative if and only if it is a symmetric function of its two arguments)
- Trace monoid
