= Commutation (neurophysiology) =

Non-commutativity in brain behaviour

In neurophysiology, commutation is the process by which the brain's neural circuits exhibit non-commutativity.

Physiologist Douglas B. Tweed and coworkers have considered whether certain neural circuits in the brain exhibit noncommutativity and state:

In noncommutative algebra, order makes a difference to multiplication, so that $a\times b\neq b\times a$. This feature is necessary for computing rotary motion, because order makes a difference to the combined effect of two rotations. It has therefore been proposed that there are non-commutative operators in the brain circuits that deal with rotations, including motor system circuits that steer the eyes, head and limbs, and sensory system circuits that handle spatial information. This idea is controversial: studies of eye and head control have revealed behaviours that are consistent with non-commutativity in the brain, but none that clearly rules out all commutative models.

Tweed goes on to demonstrate non-commutative computation in the vestibulo-ocular reflex by showing that subjects rotated in darkness can hold their gaze points stable in space – correctly computing different final eye-position commands when put through the same two rotations in different orders, in a way that is unattainable by any commutative system.
