= Leena Suhl =

Finnish-German operations researcher

Leena Suhl (born 1953) is a retired Finnish-German operations researcher specializing in transport scheduling and logistics. She was a professor of business informatics at Paderborn University and the president of the German Operations Research Society.

== Early life and education ==
Suhl was born in 1953 in Kuopio, Finland. After earning a diploma in industrial mathematics in 1979 from the Helsinki University of Technology and then working in industry, she returned to graduate study and completed a doctorate at the Helsinki University of Technology in 1988. Continuing as a postdoctoral researcher at the Helsinki University of Technology, she earned a habilitation in 1993.

== Career and later life ==
Suhl became a professor at Paderborn University in 1993, where she held the chair for business informatics and headed the Decision Support & Operations Research Lab until her retirement in 2018. Her doctoral students at Paderborn included Natalia Kliewer.

She was elected president of the German Operations Research Society in 2014, serving as president for 2015 and 2016.

== Recognition ==
In 2018, the German Operations Research Society named Suhl as an honorary member.
