= Equation xy = yx =

Exponential function

Graph of x^{y} = y^{x}. The line and curve intersect at (e, e).

In general, exponentiation fails to be commutative. However, the equation $x^y = y^x$ has infinitely many solutions, consisting of the line $x=y$ and a smooth curve passing through the line at $(e,e)$, where $e$ is Euler's number. The only integer solution that is on the curve is $2^4=4^2$.

== History ==
The equation $x^y=y^x$ is mentioned in a letter of Bernoulli to Goldbach (29 June 1728). The letter contains a statement that when $x\ne y,$ the only solutions in natural numbers are $(2, 4)$ and $(4, 2),$ although there are infinitely many solutions in rational numbers, such as $(\tfrac{27}{8}, \tfrac{9}{4})$ and $(\tfrac{9}{4}, \tfrac{27}{8})$. Other pairs consisting of algebraic numbers exist, such as $\sqrt 3$ and $3\sqrt 3$, as well as $\sqrt[3]4$ and $4\sqrt[3]4$.

The reply by Goldbach (31 January 1729) contains a general solution of the equation, obtained by substituting $y=vx.$ A similar solution was found by Euler.

J. van Hengel pointed out that if $r, n$ are positive integers with $r \geq 3$, then $r^{r+n} > (r+n)^r;$ therefore it is enough to consider possibilities $x = 1$ and $x = 2$ in order to find solutions in natural numbers.

The problem was discussed in a number of publications. In 1960, the equation was among the questions on the William Lowell Putnam Competition, which prompted Alvin Hausner to extend results to algebraic number fields.

== Positive real solutions ==
Main source:

=== Explicit form ===
An infinite set of trivial solutions in positive real numbers is given by $x = y.$ Nontrivial solutions can be written explicitly using the Lambert W function. The idea is to write the equation as $ae^b = c$ and try to match $a$ and $b$ by multiplying and raising both sides by the same value. Then apply the definition of the Lambert W function $a'e^{a'} = c' \Rightarrow a' = W(c')$ to isolate the desired variable.

$$\begin{align}
y^x &= x^y = \exp\left(y\ln x\right) & \\
y^x \exp\left(-y\ln x\right) &= 1 & \left(\mbox{multiply by } \exp\left(-y\ln x\right)\right) \\
y\exp\left(-y\frac{\ln x}{x}\right) &= 1 & \left(\mbox{raise by } 1/x\right) \\
-y\frac{\ln x}{x}\exp\left(-y\frac{\ln x}{x}\right) &= \frac{-\ln x}{x} & \left(\mbox{multiply by } \frac{-\ln x}{x}\right)
\end{align}$$

$$\Rightarrow -y\frac{\ln x}{x} = W\left(\frac{-\ln x}{x}\right)$$
$$\Rightarrow y = \frac{-x}{\ln x}\cdot W\left(\frac{-\ln x}{x}\right) = \exp\left(-W\left(\frac{-\ln x}{x}\right)\right)$$

Where in the last step we used the identity $W(x)/x = \exp(-W(x))$.

Here we split the solution into the two branches of the Lambert W function and focus on each interval of interest, applying the identities:

$$\begin{align}
W_0\left(\frac{-\ln x}{x}\right) &= -\ln x \quad&\text{for } &0 < x \le e, \\
W_{-1}\left(\frac{-\ln x}{x}\right) &= -\ln x \quad&\text{for } &x \ge e.
\end{align}$$

- $0 < x \le 1$:

$$\Rightarrow \frac{-\ln x}{x} \ge 0$$
$$\begin{align}\Rightarrow y &= \exp\left(-W_0\left(\frac{-\ln x}{x}\right)\right) \\
&= \exp\left(-(-\ln x)\right) \\
&= x \end{align}$$

- $1 < x < e$:

$$\Rightarrow \frac{-1}{e} < \frac{-\ln x}{x} < 0$$
$$\Rightarrow y = \begin{cases}
\exp\left(-W_0\left(\frac{-\ln x}{x}\right)\right) = x \\
\exp\left(-W_{-1}\left(\frac{-\ln x}{x}\right)\right)
\end{cases}$$

- $x = e$:

$$\Rightarrow \frac{-\ln x}{x} = \frac{-1}{e}$$
$$\Rightarrow y = \begin{cases}
\exp\left(-W_0\left(\frac{-\ln x}{x}\right)\right) = x \\
\exp\left(-W_{-1}\left(\frac{-\ln x}{x}\right)\right) = x
\end{cases}$$

- $x > e$:

$$\Rightarrow \frac{-1}{e} < \frac{-\ln x}{x} < 0$$
$$\Rightarrow y = \begin{cases}
\exp\left(-W_0\left(\frac{-\ln x}{x}\right)\right) \\
\exp\left(-W_{-1}\left(\frac{-\ln x}{x}\right)\right) = x
\end{cases}$$

Hence the non-trivial solutions are:

$$y = \begin{cases}
\exp\left(-W_0\left(\frac{-\ln x}{x}\right)\right) \quad &\text{for } x > e,\\
\exp\left(-W_{-1}\left(\frac{-\ln x}{x}\right)\right) \quad &\text{for } 1 < x < e.
\end{cases}$$

=== Parametric form ===
Nontrivial solutions can be more easily found by assuming $x \ne y$ and letting $y = vx.$ Then

$$(vx)^x = x^{vx} = (x^v)^x.$$

Raising both sides to the power $\tfrac{1}{x}$ and dividing by $x$, we get

$$v = x^{v-1}.$$

Then nontrivial solutions in positive real numbers are expressed as the parametric equation

$$\begin{align}x &= v^{1/(v-1)}, \\ y &= v^{v/(v-1)}.\end{align}$$

The full solution thus is $\{(x,y) : y=x\} \cup \{\left(v^{1/(v-1)},v^{v/(v-1)}\right) : v > 0, v \neq 1\}.$

Based on the above solution, the derivative $dy/dx$ is $1$ for the $(x,y)$ pairs on the line $y=x,$ and for the other $(x,y)$ pairs can be found by $(dy/dv)/(dx/dv),$ which straightforward calculus gives as:

$$\frac{dy}{dx} = v^2\left(\frac{v-1-\ln v}{v-1-v\ln v}\right)$$

for $v > 0$ and $v \neq 1.$

Setting $v=2$ or $v=\tfrac{1}{2}$ generates the nontrivial solution in positive integers, $4^2=2^4$.

The parameterization above leads to a geometric property of this curve. It can be shown that $x^y = y^x$ describes the isocline curve where power functions of the form $x^v$ have slope $v^2$ for some positive real choice of $v\neq 1$. For example, $x^8=y$ has a slope of $8^2$ at $(\sqrt[7]{8}, \sqrt[7]{8}^8),$ which is also a point on the curve $x^y=y^x.$

The trivial and non-trivial solutions intersect when $v = 1$. The equations above cannot be evaluated directly at $v = 1$, but we can take the limit as $v\to 1$. This is most conveniently done by substituting $v = 1 + 1/n$ and letting $n\to\infty$, so

$$x = \lim_{v\to 1}v^{1/(v-1)} = \lim_{n\to\infty}\left(1+\frac 1n\right)^n = e.$$

Thus, the line $y = x$ and the curve for $x^y-y^x = 0,\,\, y \ne x$ intersect at x = y = e.

As $x \to \infty$, the nontrivial solution has the line $y = 1$ for a horizontal asymptote. A more complete asymptotic form is

$$y = 1 + \frac{\ln x}{x} + \frac{3}{2} \frac{(\ln x)^2}{x^2} + \cdots.$$

== Other real solutions ==
An infinite set of discrete real solutions with at least one of $x$ and $y$ negative also exist. These are provided by the above parameterization when the values generated are real. For example, $x=\frac{1}{\sqrt[3]{-2}}$, $y=\frac{-2}{\sqrt[3]{-2}}$ is a solution (using the real cube root of $-2$). Similarly an infinite set of discrete solutions is given by the trivial solution $y=x$ for $x<0$ when $x^x$ is real; for example $x=y=-1$.

== Similar graphs ==
=== Equation ^{x}√y = ^{y}√x ===
The equation $\sqrt[x]y = \sqrt[y]x$ produces a graph where the line and curve intersect at $1/e$. The curve also terminates at (0, 1) and (1, 0), instead of continuing on to infinity.

The curved section can be written explicitly as

$y=e^{W_0(\ln(x^x))} \quad \mathrm{for} \quad 0<x<1/e$,

$y=e^{W_{-1}(\ln(x^x))} \quad \mathrm{for} \quad 1/e<x<1$.

This equation describes the isocline curve where power functions have slope 1, analogous to the geometric property of $x^y = y^x$ described above.

The equation is equivalent to $y^y=x^x,$ as can be seen by raising both sides to the power $xy.$ Equivalently, this can also be shown to demonstrate that the equation $\sqrt[y]{y}=\sqrt[x]{x}$ is equivalent to $x^y = y^x$.

=== Equation log_{x}(y) = log_{y}(x) ===
The equation $\log_x(y) = \log_y(x)$ produces a graph where the curve and line intersect at (1, 1). The curve becomes asymptotic to 0, as opposed to 1; it is, in fact, the positive section of y = 1/x.
