= Harry Suhl =

German-American physicist (1922–2020)

- Born: October 18, 1922; Leipzig, Germany
- Died: March 3, 2020 (aged 97); San Diego, California, U.S.
- Education: University of Wales (B.S.); University of Oxford (Ph.D.)
- Known for: Suhl instability Suhl–Nakamura interaction Abrikosov–Suhl resonance
- Awards: Guggenheim Fellowship (1968)

Harry Suhl (October 18, 1922 — March 3, 2020) was a German-American physicist who specialized in statistical mechanics, non-equilibrium thermodynamics, and solid-state physics, and in particular superconductivity. Various phenomena in his field of work have been named after him, such as the Suhl instability, Suhl–Nakamura interaction and Abrikosov–Suhl resonance. He died in March 2020 at the age of 97.

== Early life and career ==
Suhl was born in Leipzig, Germany, on October 18, 1922. He received a B.Sc. degree from the University of Wales in 1943, and a Ph.D. degree in theoretical physics from Oriel College of the University of Oxford, in 1948.

In 1948, he joined the Bell Telephone Laboratories at Murray Hill, New Jersey. In 1960, he was appointed professor of physics at the University of California, San Diego (UCSD) and was promoted to professor emeritus in 1991. He was chairman of the Physics Department of UCSD from 1965 to 1968 and again from 1972 to 1975, and was director of the university's Institute for Pure and Applied Physical Sciences from 1980 to 1991.

Suhl served on the board of editors for Physical Review ('55-'76) and Solid State Communications ('61-'90), and was coeditor of several standard treatises: Magnetism, a Treatise on Modern Theory and Materials (with G.T. Rado, Academic Press, New York, 5 volumes, '63-'72), Superconductivity in d- and f-Band Metals (with M.B. Maple, Academic Press, New York, 1980) and Many Body Phenomena at Surfaces (with D.C. Langreth, Academic Press, New York, 1984).

== Scientific contributions ==
Several phenomena Suhl discovered or explained have been named after him. His explanation of nonlinear effects in ferromagnetic resonance is known as the Suhl instability, and one of the major sources of broadening of nuclear magnetic resonance lines in magnetically ordered media is known as the Suhl–Nakamura interaction. A particular divergence in the calculated properties of dilute magnetic alloys is known as the Abrikosov–Suhl resonance.

== Honors and awards ==
Suhl was awarded a Guggenheim Fellowship in 1968. He was later inducted as a member of the National Academy of Sciences in 1976.

== Selected publications ==
- Ferraz, A.; Oliveria, F.; Osorio, R., eds. (1989). "Applications of Nonlinear Dynamics to Various Problems in Condensed Matter Physics". Current Trends in Condensed Matter Physics. Proceedings of Universidade de Brasilia Winter School on "Non-linear Physical Phenomena". Teaneck, New Jersey: World Scientific. doi:10.1142/0889. ISBN 978-9971-5-0950-7.
- Suhl, H. (1994), "Some Nonlinear Effects in Magnetically Ordered Materials", Nonlinear Phenomena and Chaos in Magnetic Materials, WORLD SCIENTIFIC, pp. 13–32, doi:10.1142/9789814355810_0002, ISBN 978-981-02-1005-2
- Bouzidi, Djemoui; Suhl, Harry (1990). "Motion of a Bloch domain wall". Physical Review Letters. 65 (20): 2587–2590. Bibcode:1990PhRvL..65.2587B. doi:10.1103/physrevlett.65.2587. ISSN 0031-9007. PMID 10042635.
- Che, Xiaodong; Suhl, Harry (1991). "Scaling of critical self-organized magnetic-domain formations". Physical Review B. 44 (1): 155–158. Bibcode:1991PhRvB..44..155C. doi:10.1103/physrevb.44.155. ISSN 0163-1829. PMID 9998228.
- Elmer, F. J; Burns, J; Suhl, H (1993). "Front Propagation into an Unstable Ferromagnetic State". Europhysics Letters. 22 (6): 399–404. Bibcode:1993EL.....22..399E. doi:10.1209/0295-5075/22/6/001. ISSN 0295-5075. S2CID 250801318.
- Arias, Rodrigo; Suhl, Harry (1995). "Magnetic susceptibility of a real ferromagnet near the coexistence condition". Physical Review B. 51 (2): 979–989. Bibcode:1995PhRvB..51..979A. doi:10.1103/physrevb.51.979. ISSN 0163-1829. PMID 9978248.

== Sources ==
- Arovas, Daniel; Maple, M. Brian; Kumar, Pradeep (2020). "Harry Suhl". Physics Today. 73 (12): 64. Bibcode:2020PhT....73l..64A. doi:10.1063/PT.3.4641.
