= Preda Mihăilescu =

Romanian mathematician

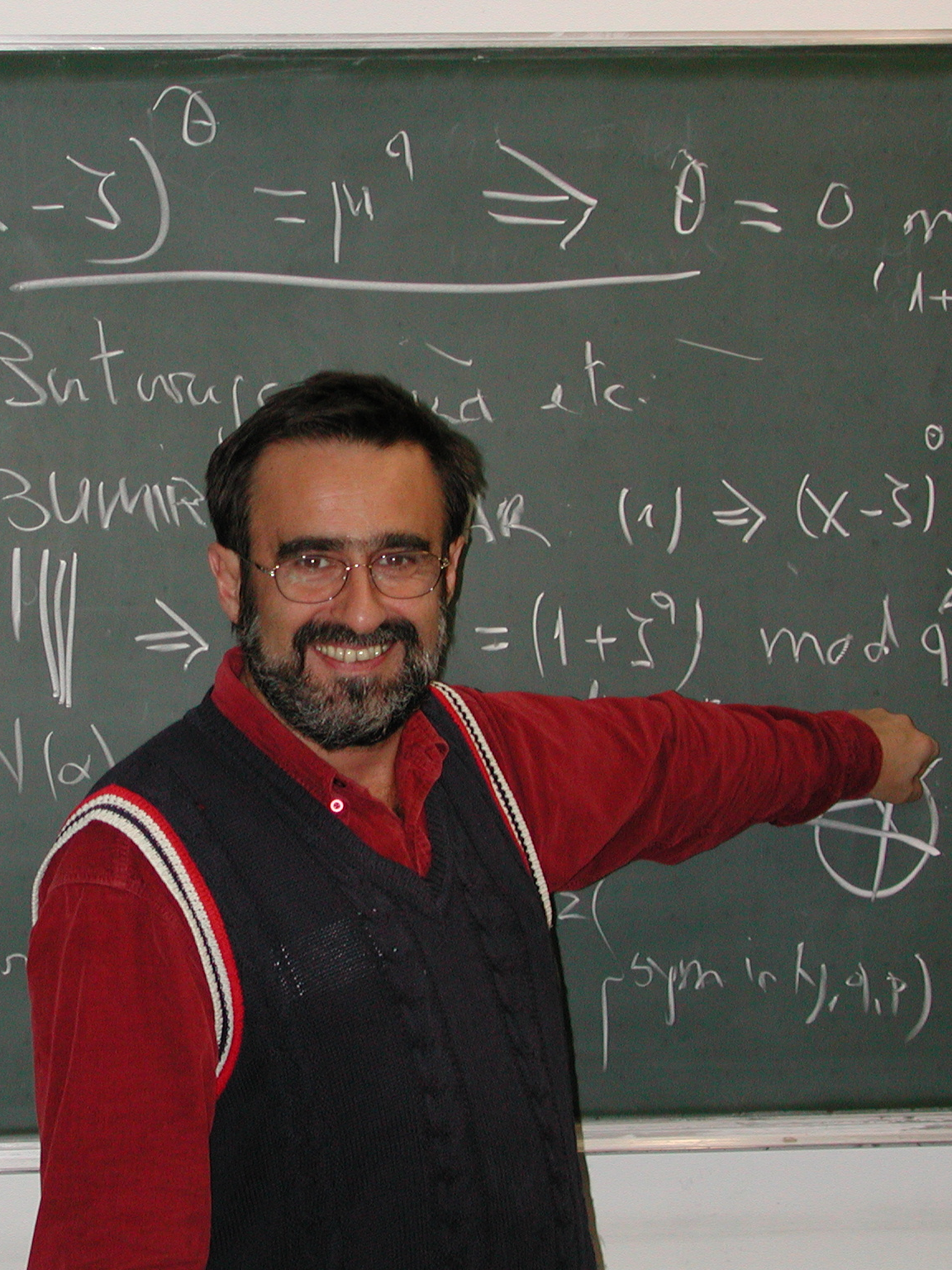
- Mihailescu in 2001
- Born: 23 May 1955 (age 71); Bucharest, Romania
- Education: ETH Zürich
- Known for: proving Catalan's conjecture
- Scientific career
- Fields: Mathematics
- Workplaces: University of Göttingen; University of Paderborn
- Doctoral advisor: Erwin Engeler; Hendrik Lenstra

Preda V. Mihăilescu (Romanian pronunciation: [mihə.iˈlesku]) (born 23 May 1955) is a Romanian mathematician, best known for his proof of the Catalan's conjecture, first proposed in 1844.

== Biography ==
Born in Bucharest, he is the brother of Vintilă Mihăilescu.

After leaving Romania in 1973, he settled in Switzerland. He studied mathematics and computer science in Zürich, receiving a PhD from ETH Zürich in 1997. His PhD thesis, titled Cyclotomy of rings and primality testing, was written under the direction of Erwin Engeler and Hendrik Lenstra.

For several years, he did research at the University of Paderborn, Germany. Since 2005, he has held a professorship at the University of Göttingen.

== Major research ==
In 2002, Mihăilescu proved Catalan's conjecture. This number-theoretical conjecture, formulated by the French and Belgian mathematician Eugène Charles Catalan in 1844, had stood unresolved for 158 years. Mihăilescu's proof appeared in Crelle's Journal in 2004.

== Sources ==
- P. J. Campbell (2002). "Science news 161". Mathematics Magazine. Vol. 75, no. 4.
- Ian Stewart (7 March 2013). The Great Mathematical Problems. Profile Books. p. 124. ISBN 978-1-84765-351-2.
- Bilu, Yuri F.; Bugeaud, Yann; Mignotte, Maurice (2014). The Problem of Catalan. Springer. OCLC 893117743.
- Metsänkylä, Tauno (2004). "Catalan's Conjecture: Another old Diophantine problem solved" (PDF). Bull. Amer. Math. Soc. 41: 43–57. doi:10.1090/s0273-0979-03-00993-5. MR 2015449.
- Mihăilescu, Preda (1997). Cyclotomy of rings and primality testing (Ph.D. thesis). ETH Zurich. Archived from the original on 4 March 2016.
- Mihăilescu, Preda (2004). "Primary Cyclotomic Units and a Proof of Catalan's Conjecture". Journal für die reine und angewandte Mathematik. 2004 (572): 167–195. doi:10.1515/crll.2004.048. MR 2076124.
- Mihăilescu, Preda (2005). Reflection, Bernoulli Numbers and the Proof of Catalan's Conjecture. European Congress of Mathematics. Stockholm, Sweden: European Mathematical Society. pp. 325–340. doi:10.4171/009-1/21. MR 2185753.
- Schoof, René (2008). Catalan's conjecture. Universitext. London: Springer. ISBN 978-1-84800-185-5. OCLC 656399081.
