= Paderborn University =

Public Research University in Paderborn

- Universität Paderborn
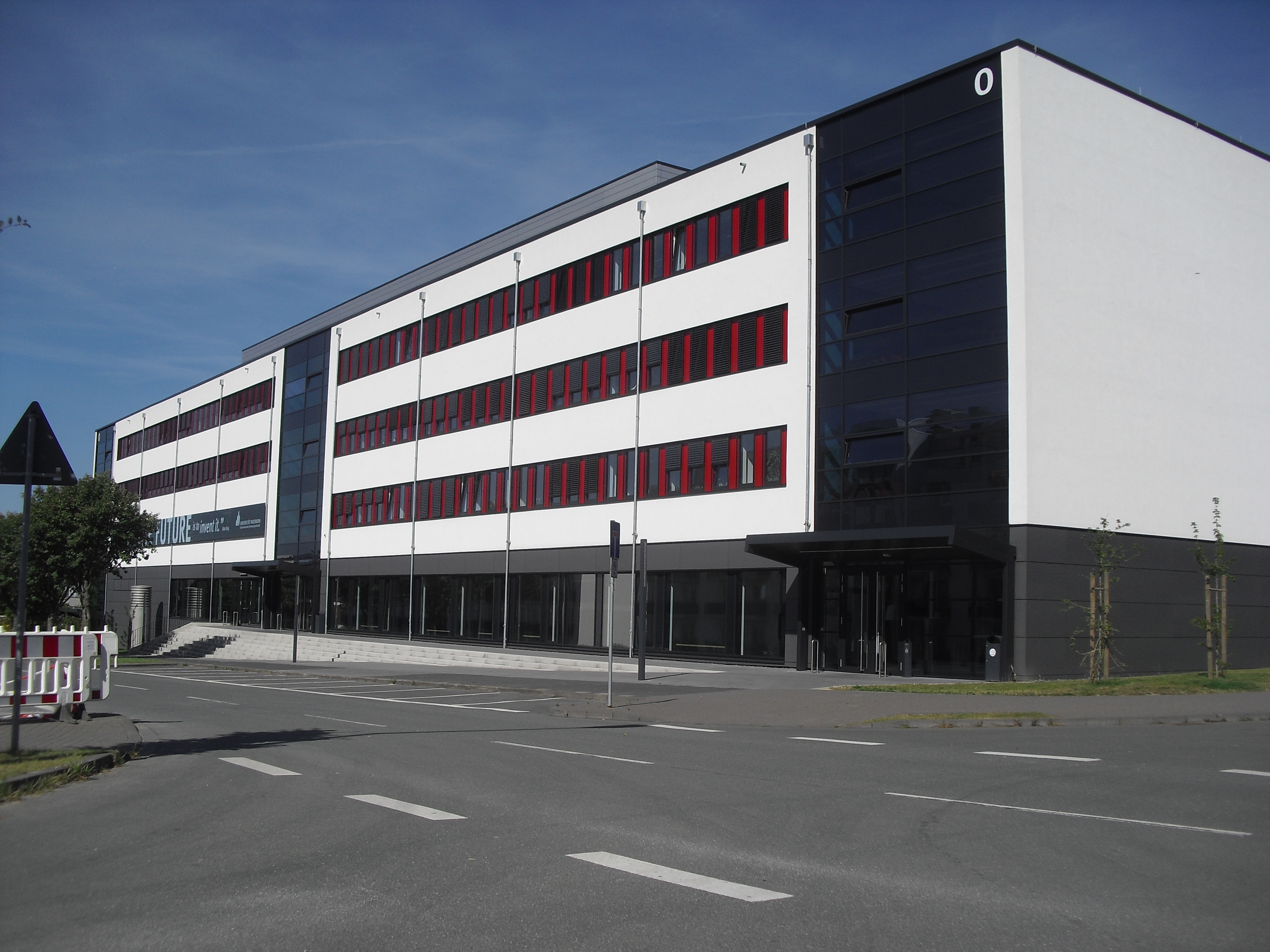
- Paderborn-Universität-Gebäude O
- Motto: Die Universität der Informationsgesellschaft
- Motto in English: The University for the Information Society
- Type: Public
- Established: 1972
- Affiliations: EUA; DAAD; ASIIN
- Budget: € 274 million (2022)
- President: Birgitt Riegraf
- Academic staff: 1,561 (2025)
- Administrative staff: 831 (2025)
- Students: 16,980 (WS 2024/2025)
- Location: Paderborn, North Rhine-Westphalia, Germany; 51°42′29″N 8°46′20″E
- Campus: 111 acres (45 ha); Urban
- Colours: Dark blue and light grey
- Website: www.uni-paderborn.de
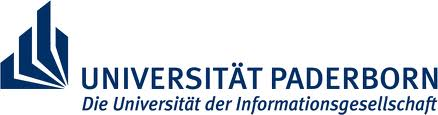

Paderborn University (German: Universität Paderborn) is a public research university in Paderborn, North Rhine-Westphalia, Germany. It was founded in 1972 and 20,308 students were enrolled at the university in the winter semester 2016/2017 in 62 different degree programmes.

The university has several winners of the Gottfried Wilhelm Leibniz Prize awarded by the German Research Foundation (DFG) and ERC grant recipients of the European Research Council. In 2002, the Romanian mathematician Preda Mihăilescu proved the Catalan conjecture, a number-theoretical conjecture, formulated by the French and Belgian mathematician Eugène Charles Catalan, which had stood unresolved for 158 years. The university closely collaborates with the Heinz Nixdorf Institute, Paderborn Center for Parallel Computing and two Fraunhofer Institutes for research in Computer Science, Mathematics, Electrical Engineering and Quantum Photonics.

In 2018, the world record for "optical data transmission at 128 gigabits per second" was achieved at the Heinz Nixdorf Institute of the University of Paderborn. The academic ranking of world universities 2018, popularly known as "shanghai rankings" placed the university in the ranking bracket 50–75 among mathematics departments worldwide.

== Campus ==
Paderborn University has two campuses:

- The main campus
- The campus on Fürstenallee

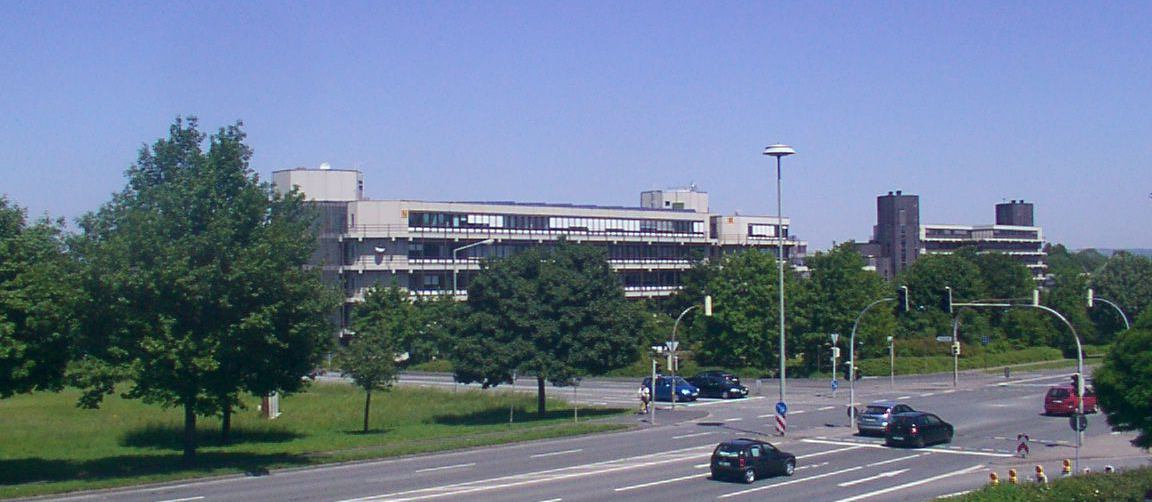
Paderborn University

Main campus

The main campus is located at Warburger Straße in Paderborn. Paderborn University owns two student halls of residence, both of which are just off the main campus. The main campus also houses the library.

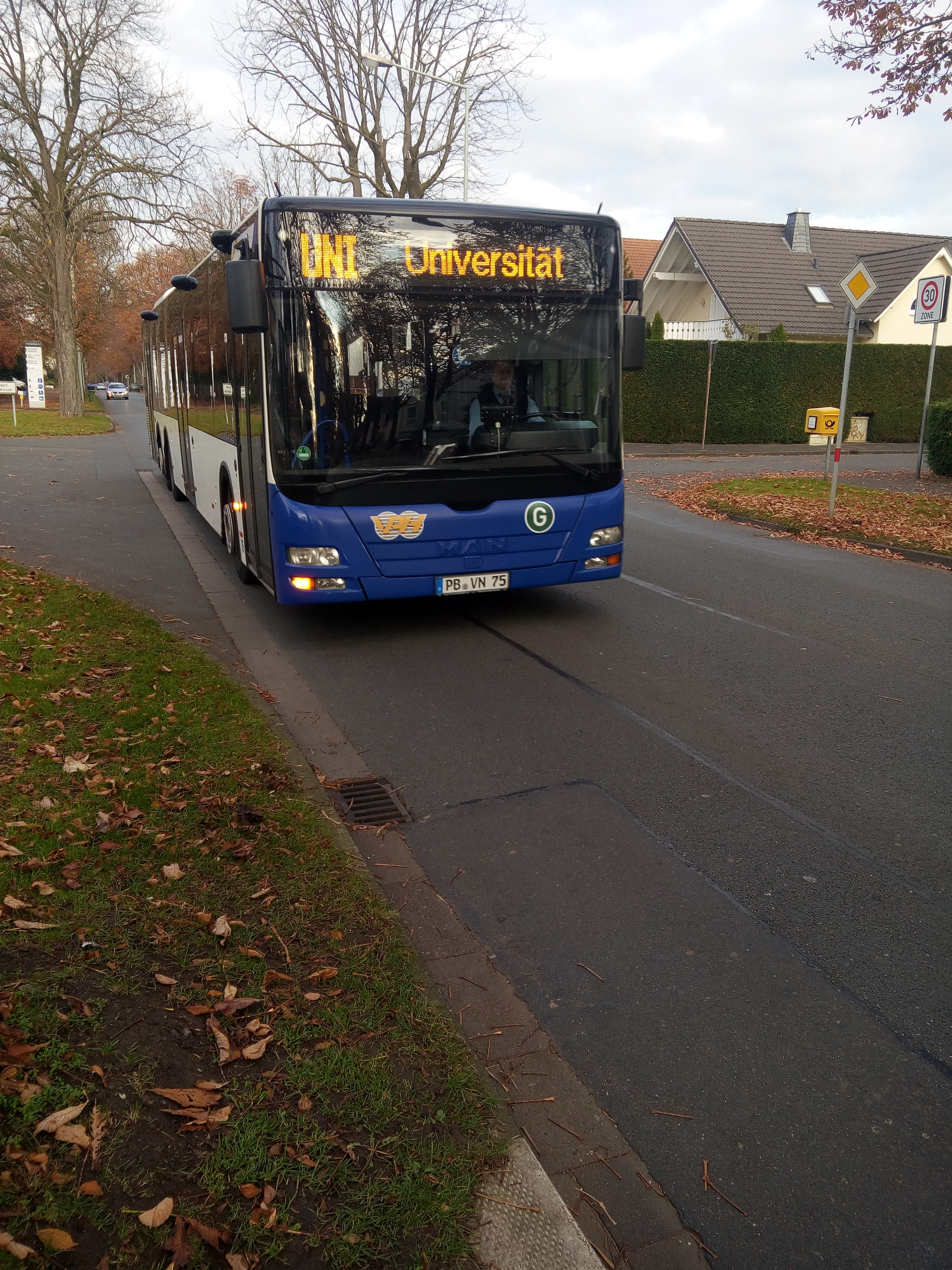
Uni-Line bus

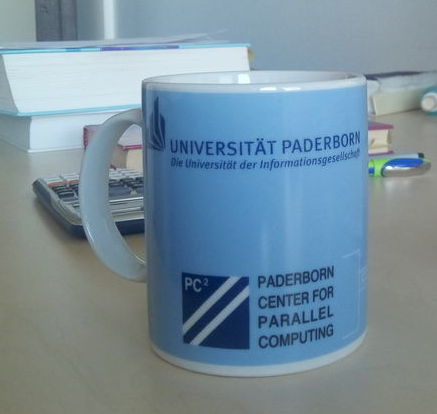
Coffee cup from Paderborn Center for Parallel Computing

=== International Office ===
The international office of Paderborn University is interconnected with over 140 partner universities worldwide and offers exchange programs. The international office works closely with the student organization Eurobiz e.V. which looks after incoming exchange students.

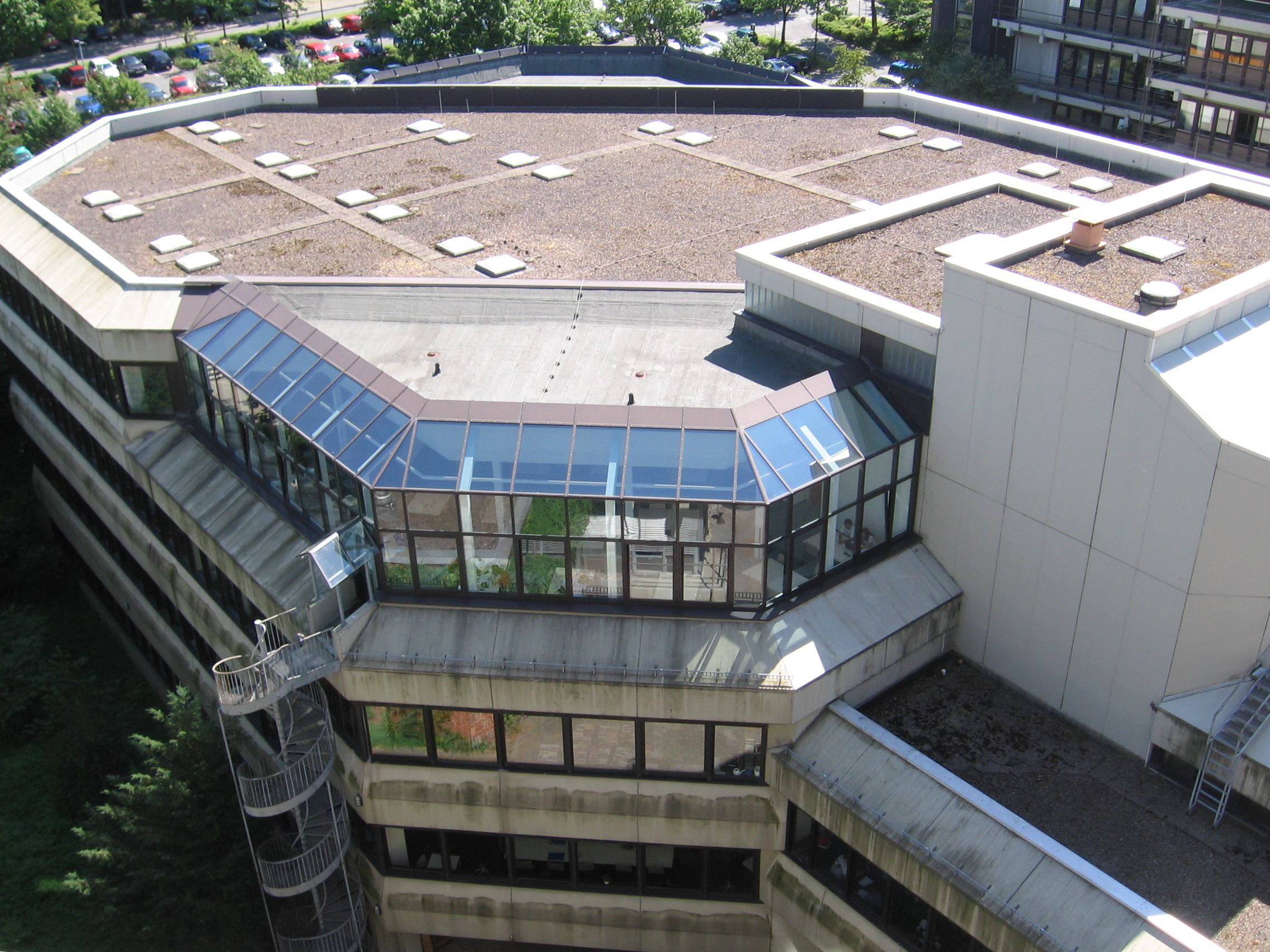
Library at the University

=== Fürstenallee ===
The Fürstenallee campus is located 5 km from the main campus and is connected to the main campus via the 'uni-line' bus. Some academic activities of the computer science and Systems engineering departments are held at the Fürstenallee campus. Next to the Fürstenallee building is the world's biggest computer museum, the Heinz Nixdorf Museum Forum. The Fürstenallee campus houses the research centers such as Heinz Nixdorf Institute, Cooperative Computing and Communication Laboratory (C-Lab) and Software quality lab (S-lab).

== Academics ==
In 2006, the computer science program was ranked among the top 3 programs in the most comprehensive and detailed ranking of German universities by the Centre for Higher Education Development (CHE) and the German weekly news magazine "Die Zeit". In the same year, the university was ranked among the leading institutions in terms of gaining research funds in the areas of electrical engineering, computer science and systems engineering by the German Research Foundation.

The interdisciplinary research centers at the university include Heinz Nixdorf Institute, Paderborn center for Parallel Computing, Paderborn Institute for Scientific Computation, Cooperative Computing and Communication Laboratory (C-Lab) and Software quality lab (S-lab). RailCab is a research project by Paderborn University. Its purpose is the examination of the use of linear engines for the propulsion of autonomous, rail mounted vehicles.

== See also ==
- List of early modern universities in Europe
