= Markov constant =

Property of an irrational number

Markov constant of a number
- View source data.

Domain, codomain and image
- Domain: Irrational numbers
- Codomain: Lagrange spectrum with $\infty$

Basic features
- Parity: even
- Period: 1

Specific values
- Maxima: $+\infty$
- Minima: √5
- Value at $\phi$: √5
- Value at √2: 2√2
- This function is undefined on rationals; hence, it is not continuous.

In number theory, specifically in Diophantine approximation theory, the Markov constant $M(\alpha)$ of an irrational number $\alpha$ is the factor for which Dirichlet's approximation theorem can be improved for $\alpha$.

== History and motivation ==
Certain numbers can be approximated well by certain rationals; specifically, the convergents of the continued fraction are the best approximations by rational numbers having denominators less than a certain bound. For example, the approximation $\pi\approx\frac{22}{7}$ is the best rational approximation among rational numbers with denominator up to 56. Also, some numbers can be approximated more readily than others. Dirichlet proved in 1840 that the least readily approximable numbers are the rational numbers, in the sense that for every irrational number there exists infinitely many rational numbers approximating it to a certain degree of accuracy that only finitely many such rational approximations exist for rational numbers. Specifically, he proved that for any number $\alpha$ there are infinitely many pairs of relatively prime numbers $(p,q)$ such that $\left|\alpha - \frac{p}{q}\right| < \frac{1}{q^2}$ if and only if $\alpha$ is irrational.

51 years later, Hurwitz further improved Dirichlet's approximation theorem by a factor of √5, improving the right-hand side from $1/q^2$ to $1/\sqrt{5}q^2$ for irrational numbers:

$$\left|\alpha - \frac{p}{q}\right| < \frac{1}{\sqrt{5}q^2}.$$

The above result is best possible since the golden ratio $\phi$ is irrational but if we replace √5 by any larger number in the above expression then we will only be able to find finitely many rational numbers that satisfy the inequality for $\alpha=\phi$.

Furthermore, he showed that among the irrational numbers, the least readily approximable numbers are those of the form $\frac{a\phi+b}{c\phi+d}$ where $\phi$ is the golden ratio, $a,b,c,d\in\Z$ and $ad-bc=\pm1$. (These numbers are said to be equivalent to $\phi$.) If we omit these numbers, just as we omitted the rational numbers in Dirichlet's theorem, then we can increase the number √5 to 2√2. Again this new bound is best possible in the new setting, but this time the number √2, and numbers equivalent to it, limits the bound. If we don't allow those numbers then we can again increase the number on the right hand side of the inequality from 2√2 to √221/5, for which the numbers equivalent to $\frac{1+\sqrt{221}}{10}$ limit the bound. The numbers generated show how well these numbers can be approximated; this can be seen as a property of the real numbers.

However, instead of considering Hurwitz's theorem (and the extensions mentioned above) as a property of the real numbers except certain special numbers, we can consider it as a property of each excluded number. Thus, the theorem can be interpreted as "numbers equivalent to $\phi$, √2 or $\frac{1+\sqrt{221}}{10}$ are among the least readily approximable irrational numbers." This leads us to consider how accurately each number can be approximated by rationals - specifically, by how much can the factor in Dirichlet's approximation theorem be increased to from 1 for that specific number.

== Definition ==
Mathematically, the Markov constant of irrational $\alpha$ is defined as $M(\alpha)=\sup \left\{\lambda\in\R : \left\vert \alpha - \frac{p}{q} \right\vert<\frac{1}{\lambda q^2} \text{ has infinitely many solutions for }p,q\in\N \right\}$. If the set does not have an upper bound we define $M(\alpha)=\infty$.

Alternatively, it can be defined as $\limsup_{k\to\infty}\frac{1}{k^2\left\vert \alpha-\frac{f(k)}{k} \right\vert}$ where $f(k)$ is defined as the closest integer to $\alpha k$.

== Properties and results ==
Hurwitz's theorem implies that $M(\alpha)\ge\sqrt{5}$ for all $\alpha\in\R-\Q$.

If $\alpha = [a_0; a_1, a_2, ...]$ is its continued fraction expansion then $M(\alpha)=\limsup_{k\to\infty}{([a_{k+1}; a_{k+2}, a_{k+3}, ...] + [0; a_{k}, a_{k-1}, ...,a_2,a_1])}$.

From the above, if $p=\limsup_{k\to\infty}{a_k}$ then $p<M(\alpha)<p+2$. This implies that $M(\alpha)=\infty$ if and only if $(a_k)$ is not bounded. In particular, $M(\alpha)<\infty$ if $\alpha$ is a quadratic irrational number. In fact, the lower bound for $M(\alpha)$ can be strengthened to $M(\alpha)\ge\sqrt{p^2+4}$, the tightest possible.

The values of $\alpha$ for which $M(\alpha)<3$ are families of quadratic irrationalities having the same period (but at different offsets), and the values of $M(\alpha)$ for these $\alpha$ are limited to Lagrange numbers. There are uncountably many numbers for which $M(\alpha)=3$, no two of which have the same ending; for instance, for each number $\alpha = [\underbrace{1;1,...,1}_{r_1},2,2,\underbrace{1,1,...,1}_{r_2},2,2,\underbrace{1,1,...,1}_{r_3},2,2,...]$ where $r_1<r_2<r_3<\cdots$, $M(\alpha)=3$.

If $\beta=\frac{p\alpha+q}{r\alpha+s}$ where $p,q,r,s\in\Z$ then $M(\beta)\ge\frac{M(\alpha)}{\left\vert ps-rq \right\vert}$. In particular if $\left\vert ps-rq \right\vert=1$ then $M(\beta)=M(\alpha)$.

The set $L=\{M(\alpha)\mid\alpha\in\R-\Q\}$ forms the Lagrange spectrum. It contains the interval $[F,\infty]$ where F is Freiman's constant. Hence, if $m>F\approx4.52783$ then there exists irrational $\alpha$ whose Markov constant is $m$.

=== Numbers having a Markov constant less than 3 ===
Burger et al. (2002) provides a formula for which the quadratic irrationality $\alpha_n$ whose Markov constant is the n^{th} Lagrange number:

$\alpha_n=\frac{2u-3m_n+\sqrt{9m_n^2-4}}{2m_n}$ where $m_n$ is the n^{th} Markov number, and u is the smallest positive integer such that $m_n\mid u^2+1$.

Nicholls (1978) provides a geometric proof of this (based on circles tangent to each other), providing a method that these numbers can be systematically found.

== Examples ==
View source data.
A demonstration that √10/2 has Markov constant √10, as stated in the example below. This plot graphs y(k) = 1/(k^{2}|α-f(αk)/k|) against log(k) (the natural log of k) where f(x) is the nearest integer to x. The dots at the top corresponding to an x-axis value of 0.7, 2.5, 4.3 and 6.1 (k=2,12,74,456) are the points for which the limit superior of √10 is approached.

=== Markov constant of two numbers ===
Since $\frac{\sqrt{10}}{2}=[1;\overline{1,1,2}]$,

$$\begin{align} M\left ( \frac{\sqrt{10}}{2} \right )
& = \max([1;\overline{2,1,1}]+[0;\overline{1,2,1}],[1;\overline{1,2,1}]+[0;\overline{2,1,1}],[2;\overline{1,1,2}]+[0;\overline{1,1,2}]) \\
& = \max\left ( \frac{2\sqrt{10}}{3},\frac{2\sqrt{10}}{3},\sqrt{10} \right ) \\
& = \sqrt{10}. \end{align}$$

As $e = [2; 1, 2, 1, 1, 4, 1, 1, 6, 1, \ldots, 1, 2n, 1, \ldots], M(e)=\infty$ because the continued fraction representation of e is unbounded.

=== Numbers α_{n} having Markov constant less than 3 ===
Consider $n=6$; Then $m_n=34$. By trial and error it can be found that $u=13$. Then

$$\begin{align} \alpha_6 & = \frac{2u-3m_6+\sqrt{9m_6^2-4}}{2m_6} \\[6pt]
& = \frac{-76+\sqrt{10400}}{68} \\[6pt]
&= \frac{-19+5\sqrt{26}}{17} \\[6pt]
&=[0;\overline{2,1,1,1,1,1,1,2}]. \end{align}$$

== See also ==
- Irrationality measure
- Lagrange number
- Continued fraction
- Lagrange spectrum
