= Irrationality measure =

Function that quantifies how near a number is to being rational

Rational approximations to the square root of 2.

In mathematics, an irrationality measure of a real number $x$ is a measure of how closely it can be approximated by a rational number.

If a function $f(t,\lambda)$, defined for $t,\lambda>0$, takes positive real values and is strictly decreasing in both variables, consider the following inequality:

$$0<\left|x-\frac pq\right|<f(q,\lambda)$$

for a given real number $x\in\R$ and rational numbers $\frac pq$ with $p\in\mathbb Z, q\in\mathbb Z^+$. For $x\in\R$, define $R$ as the set of all $\lambda\in\R^+$ for which the set $\left\{\frac{p}{q}\in\Q : \left\vert x-\frac{p}{q}\right\vert < f(q,\lambda)\right\}$ is finite. Then $\lambda(x)=\inf R$ is called an irrationality measure of $x$ with regard to $f.$ If the set $R$ is empty, $x$ is said to have infinite irrationality measure $\lambda(x)=\infty$.

By definition, there is a sequence $(\varepsilon_n)_{n\in\N}$ converging to 0 such that for every $n$, the inequality

$0<\left|x-\frac pq\right|<f(q,\lambda(x)+\varepsilon_n)$

has at most finitely many solutions $\frac pq$. By the nondecreasing property of $f$ in the second variable, we deduce that the inequality

$$0<\left|x-\frac pq\right|<f(q,\lambda(x)+\varepsilon)$$

has at most only finitely many solutions $\frac pq$ for all $\varepsilon>0$.

== Irrationality exponent ==
The irrationality exponent or Liouville–Roth irrationality measure is given by setting $f(q ,\mu)=q^{-\mu}$, a definition adapting the one of Liouville numbers — the irrationality exponent $\mu(x)$ is defined for real numbers $x$ to be the supremum of the set of $\mu$ such that $0< \left| x- \frac{p}{q} \right| < \frac{1}{q^\mu}$ is satisfied by an infinite number of coprime integer pairs $(p,q)$ with $q>0$.

For any value $n<\mu(x)$, the infinite set of all rationals $p/q$ satisfying the above inequality yields good approximations of $x$. Conversely, if $n>\mu(x)$, then there are at most finitely many coprime $(p,q)$ with $q>0$ that satisfy the inequality.

For example, whenever a rational approximation $\frac pq \approx x$ with $p,q\in\N$ yields $n+1$ exact decimal digits, then

$$\frac{1}{10^n} \ge \left| x- \frac{p}{q} \right| \ge \frac{1}{q^{\mu(x)+\varepsilon}}$$

for any $\varepsilon >0$, except for at most a finite number of "lucky" pairs $(p,q)$.

A number $x\in\mathbb R$ with irrationality exponent $\mu(x)\le 2$ is called a diophantine number, while numbers with $\mu(x)=\infty$ are called Liouville numbers.

=== Corollaries ===
Rational numbers have irrationality exponent 1, while (as a consequence of Dirichlet's approximation theorem) every irrational number has irrationality exponent at least 2.

On the other hand, an application of Borel-Cantelli lemma shows that almost all numbers, including all algebraic irrational numbers, have an irrationality exponent exactly equal to 2.

It is $\mu(x)=\mu(rx+s)$ for real numbers $x$ and rational numbers $r\neq 0$ and $s$. If for some $x$ we have $\mu(x)\le\mu$, then it follows $\mu(x^{1/ 2})\le 2\mu$.

For a real number $x$ given by its simple continued fraction expansion $x = [a_0; a_1, a_2, ...]$ with convergents $p_i/q_i$ it holds:

$$\mu(x)=1+\limsup_{n\to\infty}\frac{\ln q_{n+1}}{\ln q_n}=2+\limsup_{n\to\infty}\frac{\ln a_{n+1}}{\ln q_n} .$$

If we have $\limsup_{n\to\infty} \tfrac1{n}{\ln |q_n|} \le \sigma$ and $\lim_{n\to\infty} \tfrac1{n}{\ln |q_n x-p_n|} = - \tau$ for some positive real numbers $\sigma,\tau$, then we can establish an upper bound for the irrationality exponent of $x$ by:

$$\mu(x)\le 1 + \frac\sigma\tau$$

=== Known bounds ===
For most transcendental numbers, the exact value of their irrationality exponent is not known. Below is a table of known upper and lower bounds.

Number $x$	Irrationality exponent $\mu(x)$		Notes
Number $x$	Lower bound	Upper bound	Notes
Rational number $p/q$ with $p\in \mathbb{Z}, q\in\mathbb Z^+$	1		Every rational number $p/q$ has an irrationality exponent of exactly 1.
Irrational algebraic number $\alpha$	2		By Roth's theorem the irrationality exponent of any irrational algebraic number is exactly 2. Examples include square roots and the golden ratio $\varphi$.
$e^{2/k}, k\in\mathbb{Z}^+$	2		If the elements $a_n$ of the simple continued fraction expansion of an irrational number $x$ are bounded above $a_n<P(n)$ by an arbitrary polynomial $P$, then its irrationality exponent is $\mu(x)=2$. Examples include numbers whose continued fractions behave predictably such as $e=[2;1,2,1,1,4,1,1,6,1,...]$ and $I_0(2)/I_1(2)=[1;2,3,4,5,6,7,8,9,10,...]$.
$\tan(1/k), k\in\mathbb{Z}^+$	2		If the elements $a_n$ of the simple continued fraction expansion of an irrational number $x$ are bounded above $a_n<P(n)$ by an arbitrary polynomial $P$, then its irrationality exponent is $\mu(x)=2$. Examples include numbers whose continued fractions behave predictably such as $e=[2;1,2,1,1,4,1,1,6,1,...]$ and $I_0(2)/I_1(2)=[1;2,3,4,5,6,7,8,9,10,...]$.
$\tanh(1/k), k\in\mathbb{Z}^+$	2		If the elements $a_n$ of the simple continued fraction expansion of an irrational number $x$ are bounded above $a_n<P(n)$ by an arbitrary polynomial $P$, then its irrationality exponent is $\mu(x)=2$. Examples include numbers whose continued fractions behave predictably such as $e=[2;1,2,1,1,4,1,1,6,1,...]$ and $I_0(2)/I_1(2)=[1;2,3,4,5,6,7,8,9,10,...]$.
$S(b)$ with $b\geq 2$	2		$S(b):=\sum_{k=0}^\infty b^{-2^k}$with $b\in\Z$, has continued fraction terms which do not exceed a fixed constant.
$T(b)$ with $b\geq 2$	2		$T(b):=\sum_{k=0}^\infty t_kb^{-k}$ where $t_k$ is the Thue–Morse sequence and $b\in\Z$. See Prouhet-Thue-Morse constant.
$\ln(2)$	2	3.57455...	There are other numbers of the form $\ln (a/b)$ for which bounds on their irrationality exponents are known.
$\ln(3)$	2	5.11620...	There are other numbers of the form $\ln (a/b)$ for which bounds on their irrationality exponents are known.
$5\ln(3/2)$	2	3.43506...	There are many other numbers of the form $\sqrt{2k+1}\ln\left(\frac{\sqrt{2k+1}+1}{\sqrt{2k+1}-1}\right)$ for which bounds on their irrationality exponents are known. This is the case for $k=12$.
$\pi/\sqrt{3}$	2	4.60105...	There are many other numbers of the form $\sqrt{2k-1}\arctan\left({\frac{\sqrt{2k-1}}{k-1}}\right)$ for which bounds on their irrationality exponents are known. This is the case for $k=2$.
$\pi$	2	7.10320...	It has been proven that $\pi$'s irrationality exponent is at most $5/2$ if the Flint Hills series $\displaystyle\sum^\infty_{n=1}\frac{\csc^2 n}{n^3}$ (where n is in radians) converges, and that if the irrationality exponent is at least $5/2$ it diverges. Conversely, (theorem 2.5) proved that the Flint Hills series converges if $\pi$'s irrationality exponent is $\le5/2$, completing the biconditional (unless $\mu(\pi)=5/2$). In 2026, OpenAI released an unverified proof claiming that $\mu(\pi)=2$.
$\pi^2$	2	5.09541...	$\pi^2$ and $\zeta(2)$ are linearly dependent over $\mathbb{Q}$. $\left(\zeta(2) = \frac{\pi^2}{6}\right)$, also see the Basel problem.
$\arctan(1/2)$	2	9.27204...	There are many other numbers of the form $\arctan(1/k)$ for which bounds on their irrationality exponents are known.
$\arctan(1/3)$	2	5.94202...	There are many other numbers of the form $\arctan(1/k)$ for which bounds on their irrationality exponents are known.
Apéry's constant $\zeta(3)$	2	5.51389...	
$\Gamma(1/4)$	2	10^{143}	
Cahen's constant $C$	3		
Champernowne constants $C_b$ in base $b\geq2$	$b$		Examples include $C_{10}=0.1234567891011...=[0;8,9,1,149083,1,...]$
Liouville numbers $L$	$\infty$		The Liouville numbers are precisely those numbers having infinite irrationality exponent.

== Irrationality base ==
The irrationality base or Sondow irrationality measure is obtained by setting $f(q,\beta)=\beta^{-q}$. It is a weaker irrationality measure, being able to distinguish how well different Liouville numbers can be approximated, but yielding $\beta(x)=1$ for all other real numbers:

Let $x$ be an irrational number. If there exist real numbers $\beta \geq 1$ with the property that for any $\varepsilon >0$, there is a positive integer $q(\varepsilon)$ such that

$$\left|x -\frac{p}{q} \right| > \frac 1 {(\beta+\varepsilon)^q}$$

for all integers $p,q$ with $q \geq q(\varepsilon)$ then the least such $\beta$ is called the irrationality base of $x$ and is represented as $\beta(x)$.

If no such $\beta$ exists, then $\beta(x)=\infty$ and $x$ is called a super Liouville number.

If a real number $x$ is given by its simple continued fraction expansion $x = [a_0; a_1, a_2, ...]$ with convergents $p_i/q_i$ then it holds:

$\beta(x)=\limsup_{n\to\infty}\frac{ \ln q_{n+1}} {q_n}=\limsup_{n\to\infty}\frac{\ln a_{n+1}}{q_n}$.

=== Examples ===
Any real number $x$ with finite irrationality exponent $\mu(x)<\infty$ has irrationality base $\beta(x)=1$, while any number with irrationality base $\beta(x)>1$ has irrationality exponent $\mu(x)=\infty$ and is a Liouville number.

The number $L=[1;2,2^2,2^{2^2},...]$ has irrationality exponent $\mu(L)=\infty$ and irrationality base $\beta(L)=1$.

The numbers $\tau_a = \sum_{n=0}^\infty{\frac{1}{^{n}a}} = 1+\frac{1}{a} + \frac{1}{a^a} + \frac{1}{a^{a^a}} + \frac{1}{a^{a^{a^a}}} + ...$ (${^{n}a}$ represents tetration, $a=2,3,4...$) have irrationality base $\beta(\tau_a)=a$.

The number $S=1+\frac{1}{2^1}+\frac{1}{4^{2^1}}+\frac{1}{8^{4^{2^1}}}+\frac{1}{16^{8^{4^{2^1}}}}+\frac{1}{32^{16^{8^{4^{2^1}}}}}+\ldots$ has irrationality base $\beta(S)=\infty$, hence it is a super Liouville number.

Although it is not known whether or not $e^\pi$ is a Liouville number, it is known that $\beta(e^\pi)=1$.

== Other irrationality measures ==
=== Markov constant ===
Setting $f(q,M)=(Mq^2)^{-1}$ gives a stronger irrationality measure: the Markov constant $M(x)$. For an irrational number $x\in\R\setminus \mathbb Q$ it is the factor by which Dirichlet's approximation theorem can be improved for $x$. Namely if $c<M(x)$ is a positive real number, then the inequality

$$0<\left|x-\frac pq\right|<\frac{1}{cq^2}$$

has infinitely many solutions $\frac pq\in\mathbb Q$. If $c>M(x)$ there are at most finitely many solutions.

Dirichlet's approximation theorem implies $M(x)\ge1$ and Hurwitz's theorem gives $M(x)\ge \sqrt5$ both for irrational $x$.

This is in fact the best general lower bound since the golden ratio gives $M(\varphi)=\sqrt 5$. It is also $M(\sqrt2)=2\sqrt 2$.

Given $x = [a_0; a_1, a_2, ...]$ by its simple continued fraction expansion, one may obtain:

$$M(x)=\limsup_{n\to\infty}{([a_{n+1}; a_{n+2}, a_{n+3}, ...] + [0; a_{n}, a_{n-1}, ...,a_2,a_1])}.$$

Bounds for the Markov constant of $x = [a_0; a_1, a_2, ...]$ can also be given by $\sqrt{p^2+4}\le M(x) <p+2$ with $p=\limsup_{n\to\infty}a_n$. This implies that $M(x)=\infty$ if and only if $(a_k)$ is not bounded. The numbers with finite $M(x)$ are called badly approximable. In particular every quadratic irrational number $x$ is badly approximable.

Any number with $\mu(x)>2$ or $\beta(x)>1$ has an unbounded simple continued fraction and hence $M(x)=\infty$. A further consequence is $M(e)=\infty$.

For rational numbers $r$ it may be defined $M(r)=0$.

=== Other results ===
The values $M(e)=\infty$ and $\mu(e)=2$ imply that the inequality $0<\left|e-\frac pq\right|<\frac{1}{cq^2}$ has for all $c\in\R^+$ infinitely many solutions $\frac pq \in \mathbb Q$ while the inequality $0<\left|e-\frac pq\right|<\frac{1}{q^{2+\varepsilon}}$ has for all $\varepsilon\in\R^+$ only at most finitely many solutions $\frac pq \in \mathbb Q$. This gives rise to the question what the best upper bound is. The answer is given by:

$$0<\left|e-\frac pq\right|<\frac{c\ln\ln q}{q^2\ln q}$$

which is satisfied by infinitely many $\frac pq \in \mathbb Q$ for $c>\tfrac12$ but not for $c<\tfrac12$.

This makes the number $e$ alongside the rationals and quadratic irrationals an exception to the fact that for almost all real numbers $x\in\R$ the inequality below has infinitely many solutions $\frac pq\in\mathbb Q$: (see Khinchin's theorem)

$$0<\left|x-\frac pq\right|<\frac{1}{q^2\ln q}$$

== Mahler's generalization ==
Kurt Mahler extended the concept of an irrationality measure and defined a so-called transcendence measure, drawing on the idea of a Liouville number and partitioning the transcendental numbers into three distinct classes.

=== Mahler's irrationality measure ===
Instead of taking for a given real number $x$ the difference $|x-p/q|$ with $p/q \in\mathbb Q$, one may instead focus on term $|qx-p|=|L(x)|$ with $p,q\in\mathbb Z$ and $L\in\mathbb Z[x]$ with $\deg L = 1$. Consider the following inequality:

$0<|qx-p|\le\max(|p|,|q|)^{-\omega}$ with $p,q\in\mathbb Z$ and $\omega\in\R^+_0$.

Define $R$ as the set of all $\omega\in\R^+_0$ for which infinitely many solutions $p,q\in\mathbb Z$ exist, such that the inequality is satisfied. Then $\omega_1(x)=\sup M$ is Mahler's irrationality measure. It gives $\omega_1(p/q)=0$ for rational numbers, $\omega_1(\alpha)=1$ for algebraic irrational numbers and in general $\omega_1(x)=\mu(x)-1$, where $\mu(x)$ denotes the irrationality exponent.

=== Transcendence measure ===
Mahler's irrationality measure can be generalized as follows: Take $P$ to be a polynomial with $\deg P \le n\in\mathbb Z^+$ and integer coefficients $a_i\in\mathbb Z$. Then define a height function $H(P)=\max(|a_0|,|a_1|,...,|a_n|)$ and consider for complex numbers $z$ the inequality:

$0<|P(z)|\le H(P)^{-\omega}$ with $\omega\in\R^+_0$.

Set $R$ to be the set of all $\omega\in\R^+_0$ for which infinitely many such polynomials exist, that keep the inequality satisfied. Further define $\omega_n(z)= \sup R$ for all $n\in\mathbb Z^+$ with $\omega_1(z)$ being the above irrationality measure, $\omega_2(z)$ being a non-quadraticity measure, etc.

Then Mahler's transcendence measure is given by:

$$\omega(z)=\limsup_{n\to\infty}\omega_n(z).$$

The transcendental numbers can now be divided into the following three classes:

If for all $n\in\mathbb Z^+$ the value of $\omega_n (z)$ is finite and $\omega(z)$ is finite as well, $z$ is called an S-number (of type $\omega(z)$).

If for all $n\in\mathbb Z^+$ the value of $\omega_n (z)$ is finite but $\omega(z )$ is infinite, $z$ is called an T-number.

If there exists a smallest positive integer $N$ such that for all $n\ge N$ the $\omega_n(z)$ are infinite, $z$ is called an U-number (of degree $N$).

The number $z$ is algebraic (and called an A-number) if and only if $\omega(z)=0$.

Almost all numbers are S-numbers. In fact, almost all real numbers give $\omega(x)=1$ while almost all complex numbers give $\omega(z)=\tfrac12$. The number e is an S-number with $\omega(e)=1$. The number π is either an S- or T-number. The U-numbers are a set of measure 0 but still uncountable. They contain the Liouville numbers which are exactly the U-numbers of degree one.

=== Linear independence measure ===
Another generalization of Mahler's irrationality measure gives a linear independence measure. For real numbers $x_1,...,x_n\in \R$ consider the inequality

$0<|c_1x_1+...+c_nx_n|\le\max(|c_1|,...,|c_n|)^{-\nu}$ with $c_1,...,c_n\in\Z$ and $\nu\in\R^+_0$.

Define $R$ as the set of all $\nu\in\R^+_0$ for which infinitely many solutions $c_1,...c_n \in\mathbb Z$ exist, such that the inequality is satisfied. Then $\nu(x_1,...,x_n)= \sup R$ is the linear independence measure.

If the $x_1,...,x_n$ are linearly dependent over $\mathbb\Q$ then $\nu(x_1,...,x_n)=0$.

If $1,x_1,...,x_n$ are linearly independent algebraic numbers over $\mathbb\Q$ then $\nu(1,x_1,...,x_n)\le n$.

It is further $\nu(1,x)=\omega_1(x)=\mu(x)-1$.

== Other generalizations ==
=== Koksma’s generalization ===
Jurjen Koksma in 1939 proposed another generalization, similar to that of Mahler, based on approximations of complex numbers by algebraic numbers.

For a given complex number $z$ consider algebraic numbers $\alpha$ of degree at most $n$. Define a height function $H(\alpha)=H(P)$, where $P$ is the characteristic polynomial of $\alpha$ and consider the inequality:

$0<|z-\alpha|\le H(\alpha)^{-\omega^*-1}$ with $\omega^*\in\R^+_0$.

Set $R$ to be the set of all $\omega^*\in\R^+_0$ for which infinitely many such algebraic numbers $\alpha$ exist, that keep the inequality satisfied. Further define $\omega_n^*(z)=\sup R$ for all $n\in\mathbb Z^+$ with $\omega_1^*(z)$ being an irrationality measure, $\omega_2^*(z)$ being a non-quadraticity measure, etc.

Then Koksma's transcendence measure is given by:

$$\omega^*(z)=\limsup_{n\to\infty}\omega_n^*(z)$$.

The complex numbers can now once again be partitioned into four classes A*, S*, T* and U*. However it turns out that these classes are equivalent to the ones given by Mahler in the sense that they produce exactly the same partition.

=== Simultaneous approximation of real numbers ===
Given a real number $x\in \R$, an irrationality measure of $x$ quantifies how well it can be approximated by rational numbers $\frac pq$ with denominator $q\in\mathbb Z^+$. If $x=\alpha$ is taken to be an algebraic number that is also irrational one may obtain that the inequality

$$0<\left|\alpha-\frac pq\right|<\frac {1}{q^\mu}$$

has only at most finitely many solutions $\frac pq\in \mathbb Q$ for $\mu>2$. This is known as Roth's theorem.

This can be generalized: Given a set of real numbers $x_1,...,x_n\in \R$ one can quantify how well they can be approximated simultaneously by rational numbers $\frac{p_1}{q},...,\frac{p_n}{q}$ with the same denominator $q\in\mathbb Z^+$. If the $x_i=\alpha_i$ are taken to be algebraic numbers, such that $1,\alpha_1,...,\alpha_n$ are linearly independent over the rational numbers $\mathbb Q$ it follows that the inequalities

$$0<\left|\alpha_i-\frac{p_i}{q}\right|<\frac {1}{q^\mu}, \forall i\in\{1,...,n\}$$

have only at most finitely many solutions $\left(\frac{p_1}{q},...,\frac{p_n}{q}\right)\in \mathbb Q^n$ for $\mu> 1 + \frac 1n$. This result is due to Wolfgang M. Schmidt.

== See also ==
- Diophantine approximation
- Transcendental number
- Continued fraction
- Brjuno number
