= Brjuno number =

Special type of irrational number

In mathematics, a Brjuno number (sometimes spelled Bruno or Bryuno) is a special type of irrational number named for Russian mathematician Alexander Bruno, who introduced them in Brjuno (1971).

== Formal definition ==
An irrational number $\alpha$ is called a Brjuno number when the infinite sum

$$B(\alpha) = \sum_{n=0}^\infty \frac{\log q_{n+1}}{q_n}$$

converges to a finite number.

Here:

- $q_n$ is the denominator of the nth convergent $\tfrac{p_n}{q_n}$ of the continued fraction expansion of $\alpha$.
- $B$ is a Brjuno function

== Examples ==
Consider the golden ratio 𝜙:

$$\phi = \frac{1+\sqrt{5}}{2} = 1+\cfrac{1}{1+\cfrac{1}{1+\cfrac{1}{1+\cfrac{1}{\ddots}}}}.$$

Then the nth convergent $\frac{p_n}{q_n}$ can be found via the recurrence relation:

$$\begin{cases}
p_n = p_{n-1} + p_{n-2} & \text{ with } p_0=1,p_1=2, \\
q_n = q_{n-1} + q_{n-2} & \text{ with } q_0=q_1=1.
\end{cases}$$

It is easy to see that $q_{n+1}<q_n^2$ for $n \ge 2$, as a result

$$\frac{\log{q_{n+1}}}{q_n} < \frac{2\log{q_{n}}}{q_n} \text{ for } n \ge 2$$

and since it can be proven that $\sum_{n=0}^\infty \frac{\log q_n}{q_n} < \infty$ for any irrational number, 𝜙 is a Brjuno number. Moreover, a similar method can be used to prove that any irrational number whose continued fraction expansion ends with a string of 1's is a Brjuno number.

By contrast, consider the constant $\alpha = [a_0,a_1,a_2,\ldots]$ with $(a_n)$ defined as

$$a_n = \begin{cases}
10            & \text{ if } n  =  0,1, \\
q_n^{q_{n-1}} & \text{ if } n \ge 2.
\end{cases}$$

Then $q_{n+1}>q_n^\frac{2q_n}{q_{n-1}}$, so we have by the ratio test that $\sum_{n=0}^\infty \frac{\log q_{n+1}}{q_n}$ diverges. $\alpha$ is therefore not a Brjuno number.

== Importance ==
The Brjuno numbers are important in the one-dimensional analytic small divisors problems. Brjuno improved the diophantine condition in Siegel's Theorem by showing that germs of holomorphic functions with linear part $e^{2\pi i \alpha}$ are linearizable if $\alpha$ is a Brjuno number. Jean-Christophe Yoccoz (1995) showed in 1987 that Brjuno's condition is sharp; more precisely, he proved that for quadratic polynomials, this condition is not only sufficient but also necessary for linearizability.

== Properties ==
Intuitively, these numbers do not have many large "jumps" in the sequence of convergents, in which the denominator of the (n + 1)th convergent is exponentially larger than that of the nth convergent. Thus, in contrast to the Liouville numbers, they do not have unusually accurate diophantine approximations by rational numbers.

== Brjuno function ==
=== Brjuno sum ===
The Brjuno sum or Brjuno function $B$ is

$$B(\alpha) = \sum_{n=0}^\infty \frac{\log q_{n+1}}{q_n}$$

where:

- $q_n$ is the denominator of the nth convergent $\tfrac{p_n}{q_n}$ of the continued fraction expansion of $\alpha$.

=== Real variant ===
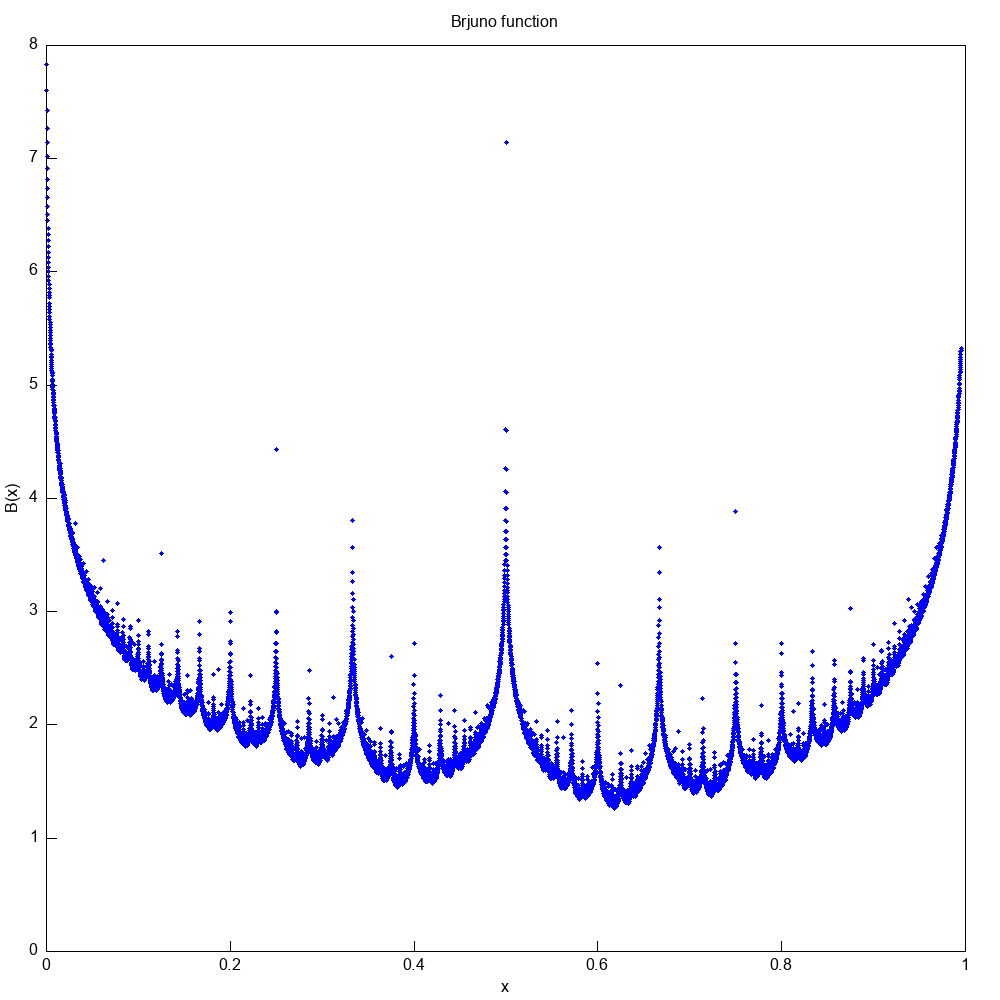
Brjuno function

The real Brjuno function $B(\alpha)$ is defined for irrational numbers $\alpha$

$$B : \R \setminus \Q  \to \R \cup \{ +\infty \}$$

and satisfies

$$\begin{align}
B(\alpha) &= B(\alpha+1) \\
B(\alpha) &= - \log \alpha + \alpha B(1/\alpha)
\end{align}$$

for all irrational $\alpha$ between 0 and 1.

=== Yoccoz's variant ===
Yoccoz's variant of the Brjuno sum defined as follows:

$$Y(\alpha)=\sum_{n=0}^{\infty} \alpha_0\cdots \alpha_{n-1} \log \frac{1}{\alpha_n},$$

where:

- $\alpha$ is irrational real number: $\alpha\in \R \setminus \Q$
- $\alpha_0$ is the fractional part of $\alpha$
- $\alpha_{n+1}$ is the fractional part of $\frac{1}{\alpha_n}$

This sum converges if and only if the Brjuno sum does, and in fact their difference is bounded by a universal constant.

== See also ==
- Irrationality measure
- Markov constant
