= Liouville's theorem =

Liouville's theorem has various meanings, all mathematical results named after Joseph Liouville:

- In complex analysis, see Liouville's theorem (complex analysis)
  - There is also a related theorem on harmonic functions
- In conformal mappings, see Liouville's theorem (conformal mappings)
- In Hamiltonian mechanics, see Liouville's theorem (Hamiltonian) and Liouville–Arnold theorem
- In linear differential equations, see Liouville's formula
- In transcendence theory and diophantine approximations, the theorem that any Liouville number is transcendental
- In differential algebra, see Liouville's theorem (differential algebra)
- In differential geometry, see Liouville's equation
- In coarse-grained modelling, see Liouville's equation in coarse graining phase space in classical physics and fine graining of states in quantum physics (von Neumann density matrix)
