= Markov tree =

Markov tree may refer to:

- A tree whose vertices correspond to Markov numbers
- A Markov chain
