= Markov spectrum =

Complicated set of real numbers

In mathematics, the Markov spectrum, devised by Andrey Markov, is a complicated set of real numbers arising in Markov Diophantine equations and also in the theory of Diophantine approximation.

== Quadratic form characterization ==
Consider a quadratic form given by f(x,y) = ax^{2} + bxy + cy^{2} and suppose that its discriminant is fixed, say equal to 1. In other words, b^{2} − 4ac = 1.

One can ask for the minimal value achieved by $\left\vert f(x,y) \right\vert$ when it is evaluated at non-zero vectors of the grid $\mathbb{Z}^2$, and if this minimum does not exist, for the infimum.

The Markov spectrum M is the set obtained by repeating this search with different quadratic forms with discriminant fixed to 1:
$$M = \left\{ \left(\inf_{(x,y)\in \Z^2 \smallsetminus \{(0,0)\}} |f(x,y)| \right)^{-1} : f(x,y) = ax^2 + bxy + cy^2,\ b^2- 4ac = 1 \right\}$$

== Lagrange spectrum ==
Starting from Hurwitz's theorem on Diophantine approximation, that any real number $\xi$ has a sequence of rational approximations m/n tending to it with

$$\left |\xi-\frac{m}{n}\right |<\frac{1}{\sqrt{5}\, n^2},$$

it is possible to ask for each value of 1/c with 1/c ≥ √5 about the existence of some $\xi$ for which

$$\left |\xi-\frac{m}{n}\right |<\frac{c} {n^2}$$

for such a sequence, for which c is the best possible (maximal) value. Such 1/c make up the Lagrange spectrum L, a set of real numbers at least √5 (which is the smallest value of the spectrum). The formulation with the reciprocal is awkward, but the traditional definition invites it; looking at the set of c instead allows a definition instead by means of an inferior limit. For that, consider

$$\liminf_{n \to \infty}n^2\left |\xi-\frac{m}{n}\right |,$$

where m is chosen as an integer function of n to make the difference minimal. This is a function of $\xi$, and the reciprocal of the Lagrange spectrum is the range of values it takes on irrational numbers.

=== Relation with Markov spectrum ===
The Lagrange spectrum is a proper subset of the Markov spectrum. The initial part of the Lagrange spectrum, namely the part lying in the interval [√5, 3), is also the initial part of Markov spectrum. The first few values are √5, √8, √221/5, √1517/13, ... and the nth number of this sequence (that is, the nth Lagrange number) can be calculated from the nth Markov number by the formula
$$L_n = \sqrt{9 - {4 \over {m_n}^2}}.$$
Freiman's constant is the name given to the end of the last gap in the Lagrange spectrum, namely:

$F = \frac{2\,221\,564\,096 + 283\,748\sqrt{462}}{491\, 993\, 569} = 4.5278295661\dots$ (sequence A118472 in the OEIS).

All real numbers in [${{F}}, \infty$) - known as Hall’s ray - are members of the Lagrange spectrum.

== Geometry of Markov and Lagrange spectrum ==
On one hand, the initial part of the Markov and Lagrange spectrum lying in the interval [√5, 3) are both equal and they are a discrete set. On the other hand, the final part of these sets lying after Freiman's constant are also equal, but a continuous set. The geometry of the part between the initial part and final part has a fractal structure, and can be seen as a geometric transition between the discrete initial part and the continuous final part. This is stated precisely in the next theorem:

Theorem—Given $t \in \R$, the Hausdorff dimension of $L\cap(-\infty,t)$ is equal to the Hausdorff dimension of $M\cap(-\infty,t)$. Moreover, if d is the function defined as $d(t):=\dim_{H}(M\cap(-\infty,t))$, where dim_{H} denotes the Hausdorff dimension, then d is continuous and maps R onto [0,1].

== See also ==
- Markov number
