= Lonely runner conjecture =

Unsolved problem in mathematics

Unsolved problem in mathematics
Is the lonely runner conjecture true for every number of runners?
More unsolved problems in mathematics

In number theory, specifically the study of Diophantine approximation, the lonely runner conjecture is a conjecture about the long-term behavior of runners on a circular track. It states that $n$ runners on a track of unit length, with constant speeds all distinct from one another, will each be lonely at some time—at least $1/n$ units away from all others.

The conjecture was first posed in 1967 by German mathematician Jörg Wills, in purely number-theoretic terms, and independently as a view-obstruction problem in 1974 by Thomas W. Cusick; its illustrative and now-popular formulation dates to 1998. The conjecture is known to be true for $13$ runners or fewer, but the general case remains unsolved. Implications of the conjecture include solutions to view-obstruction problems and bounds on properties, related to chromatic numbers, of certain graphs.

== Formulation ==
Example of a case of the conjecture with n=6 runners. Runners colored black have not yet been lonely. The white arcs, of length 2/n, indicate that a runner is currently lonely. Yellow runners have experienced loneliness.

Consider $n$ runners on a circular track of unit length. At the initial time $t=0$, all runners are at the same position and start to run; the runners' speeds are constant, all distinct, and may be negative. A runner is said to be lonely at time $t$ if they are at a distance (measured along the circle) of at least $1/n$ from every other runner. The lonely runner conjecture states that each runner is lonely at some time, no matter the choice of speeds.

This visual formulation of the conjecture was first published in 1998. In many formulations, including the original by Jörg M. Wills, some simplifications are made. The runner to be lonely is stationary at 0 (with zero speed), and therefore $n-1$ other runners, with nonzero speeds, are considered. (Note: Some authors use the convention that $n$ is the number of non-stationary runners, and thus the conjecture is that the gap of loneliness is at most $1/(n+1)$.) The moving runners may be further restricted to positive speeds only: by symmetry, runners with speeds $x$ and $-x$ have the same distance from 0 at all times, and so are essentially equivalent. Proving the result for any stationary runner implies the general result for all runners, since they can be made stationary by subtracting their speed from all runners, leaving them with zero speed. The conjecture then states that, for any collection $v_1,v_2,\dots,v_{n-1}$ of positive, distinct speeds, there exists some time $t>0$ such that
$$\frac{1}{n}\leq \operatorname{frac}(v_it)\leq 1-\frac{1}{n}\qquad (i=1,\dots,n-1),$$
where $\operatorname{frac}(x)$ denotes the fractional part of $x$. Interpreted visually, if the runners are running counterclockwise, the middle term of the inequality is the distance from the origin to the $i$th runner at time $t$, measured counterclockwise. (Note: For example, if the origin is at a 6 o'clock position, a runner at the 9 o'clock position will have $\operatorname{frac}(vt)=3/4$.) This convention is used for the rest of this article.

Wills' conjecture was part of his work in Diophantine approximation, the study of how closely fractions can approximate irrational numbers: Dirichlet's approximation theorem (~1840) says that for every real number $t$ and positive integer $n$, there exists an integer $q \in \{ 1, 2, \dots, n-1 \}$ such that the distance of $t q$ to the nearest integer is $\le \frac 1 n$. Wills asked if this result can be improved if one is allowed to replace $\{ 1, 2, \dots, n-1 \}$ with another set of $n-1$ positive integers, and the lonely runner conjecture states that it cannot.

== Implications ==
Squares of side length 1/3 placed at every half-integer coordinate obstruct any ray from the origin (besides those lying on an axis). Any smaller side length will leave small gaps.

Suppose $C$ is a n-hypercube of side length $s$ in n-dimensional space ($n\geq2$). Place a centered copy of $C$ at every point with half-integer coordinates. A ray from the origin may either miss all of the copies of $C$, in which case there is a (infinitesimal) gap, or hit at least one copy. Cusick (1973) made an independent formulation of the lonely runner conjecture in this context; the conjecture implies that there are gaps if and only if $s<(n-1)/(n+1)$, ignoring rays lying in one of the coordinate hyperplanes. For example, placed in 2-dimensional space, squares any smaller than $1/3$ in side length will leave gaps, as shown, and squares with side length $1/3$ or greater will obstruct every ray that is not parallel to an axis. The conjecture generalizes this observation into any number of dimensions.

In graph theory, a distance graph $G$ on the set of integers, and using some finite set $D$ of positive integer distances, has an edge between $x,y$ if and only if $|x-y|\in D$. For example, if $D=\{2\}$, every consecutive pair of even integers, and of odd integers, is adjacent, all together forming two connected components. A k-regular coloring of the integers with step $\lambda\in\mathbb{R}$ assigns to each integer $n$ one of $k$ colors based on the residue of $\lfloor \lambda n\rfloor$modulo $k$. For example, if $\lambda=0.5$, the coloring repeats every $2k$ integers and each pair of integers $2m, 2m+1$ are the same color. Taking $k=|D|+1$, the lonely runner conjecture implies $G$ admits a proper k-regular coloring (i.e., each node is colored differently than its adjacencies) for some step value. For example, $(k,\lambda)=(2,0.5)$ generates a proper coloring on the distance graph generated by $D=\{2\}$. ($k$ is known as the regular chromatic number of $D$.)

Given a directed graph $G$, a nowhere-zero flow on $G$ associates a positive value $f(e)$ to each edge $e$, such that the flow outward from each node is equal to the flow inward. The lonely runner conjecture implies that, if $G$ has a nowhere-zero flow with at most $k$ distinct integer values, then $G$ has a nowhere-zero flow with values only in $\{1,2,\ldots,k\}$ (possibly after reversing the directions of some arcs of $G$). This result was proven for $k\geq 5$ with separate methods, and because the smaller cases of the lonely runner conjecture are settled, the full theorem is proven.

== Known results ==
For a given setup of runners, let $\delta$ denote the smallest of the runners' maximum distances of loneliness, and the gap of loneliness $\delta_n$ denote the minimum $\delta$ across all setups with $n$ runners. In this notation, the conjecture asserts that $\delta_n\geq 1/n$, a bound which, if correct, cannot be improved. For example, if the runner to be lonely is stationary and speeds $v_i=i$ are chosen, then there is no time at which they are strictly more than $1/n$ units away from all others, showing that $\delta_n \leq 1/n$. (Note: Let the lonely runner be fixed at 0. For sake of contradiction, suppose there exists $t$ such that $\{v_it\}\in (1/n, 1-1/n)$ for all $i$. By the pigeonhole principle, there exist distinct $i$ and $j$ such that $\{v_it\}\leq \{v_jt\} < \{v_it\}+1/n$ But $\|v_j-v_i\|=v_k$ for some $k$, so either $\{v_kt\}=\{v_jt\}-\{v_it\}<1/n$ or $\{v_kt\}=1-(\{v_jt\}-\{v_it\})>1-1/n$, a contradiction.) Alternatively, this conclusion can be quickly derived from the Dirichlet approximation theorem. For $n\geq 2$ a simple lower bound $\delta_n\geq 1/(2n-2)$ may be obtained via a probability argument.

The conjecture can be reduced to restricting the runners' speeds to positive integers: If the conjecture is true for $n$ runners with integer speeds, it is true for $n$ runners with real speeds.

=== Tighter bounds ===
Slight improvements on the lower bound $1/(2n-2)$ are known. Chen & Cusick (1999) showed for $n\geq 5$ that if $2n-5$ is prime, then $\delta_n\geq \tfrac{1}{2n-5}$, and if $4n-9$ is prime, then $\delta_n\geq \tfrac{2}{4n-9}$. Perarnau & Serra (2016) showed unconditionally for sufficiently large $n$ that
$$\delta_n\geq \frac{1}{2n-4+o(1)}.$$

Tao (2018) proved the current best known asymptotic result: for sufficiently large $n$,
$$\delta_n\geq \frac{1}{2n-2}+\frac{c\log n}{n^2(\log\log n)^2}$$
for some constant $c>0$. He also showed that the full conjecture is implied by proving the conjecture for integer speeds of size $n^{O(n^2)}$ (see big O notation). Malikiosis, Santos & Schymura (2025) reduced it further to $n^{2n}$. This implication theoretically allows proving the conjecture for a given $n$ by checking a finite set of cases, but the number of cases grows too quickly to be practical.

The conjecture has been proven under specific assumptions on the runners' speeds. For sufficiently large $n$, it holds true if
$$\frac{v_{i+1}}{v_i}\geq 1 + \frac{22\log(n-1)}{n-1} \qquad (i=1,\dots,n-2).$$
In other words, the conjecture holds true for large $n$ if the speeds grow quickly enough. If the constant 22 is replaced with 33, then the conjecture holds true for $n\geq 16343$. A similar result for sufficiently large $n$ only requires a similar assumption for $i =\lfloor n/22 \rfloor-1,\dots,n-2$. Unconditionally on $n$, the conjecture is true if $v_{i+1}/v_i\geq 2$ for all $i$.

=== For specific n ===
The conjecture is true for $n\leq 13$ runners. The proofs for $n\leq 3$ are elementary; the $n=4$ case was established in 1972. The $n=5$, $n=6$, and $n=7$ cases were settled in 1984, 2001, and 2008, respectively. The first proof for $n=5$ was computer-assisted, but all cases for $n \leq 7$ have since been proved with elementary methods. Building upon results concerning "finite checking" by Tao (2018) which were later improved by Malikiosis, Santos & Schymura (2025), Rosenfeld (2025a) settled the $n = 8$ case. This method was subsequently and independently extended by Rosenfeld (2025b) to handle $n = 9$ runners, by Trakulthongchai (2025) to handle $n = 9$ and $n = 10$ runners, and by Sungkawichai & Trakulthongchai (2026) to handle $n = 11$, $n = 12$, and $n = 13$ runners.

For some $n$, there exist sporadic examples with a maximum separation of $1/n$ besides the example of $v_i=i$ given above. For $n=5$, the only known example (up to shifts and scaling) is $\{0,1,3,4,7\}$; for $n=6$ the only known example is $\{0,1,3,4,5,9\}$; and for $n=8$ the known examples are $\{0,1,4,5,6,7,11,13\}$ and $\{0,1,2,3,4,5,7,12\}$. There exists an explicit infinite family of such sporadic cases.

Kravitz (2021) formulated a sharper version of the conjecture that addresses near-equality cases. More specifically, he conjectures that for a given set of speeds $v_i$, either $\delta = s/(s(n-1)+1)$ for some positive integer $s$, (Note: Taking $s=1$ yields the lonely runner conjecture.) or $\delta \geq 1/(n-1)$, where $\delta$ is that setup's gap of loneliness. He confirmed this conjecture for $n\leq 4$ and a few special cases.

Rifford (2022) addressed the question of the size of the time required for a runner to get lonely. He formulated a stronger conjecture stating that for every integer $n \geq 3$ there is a positive integer $N$ such that for any collection $v_1,v_2,\dots,v_{n-1}$ of positive, distinct speeds, there exists some time $t>0$ such that $\operatorname{frac}(v_it)\in [1/n,1-1/n]$ for $i=1, \dots,n-1$ with
$$t \leq \frac{N}{\operatorname{min} (v_1,\dots, v_{n-1})}.$$
Rifford confirmed this conjecture for $n=3,4,5,6$ and showed that the minimal $N$ in each case is given by $N=1$ for $n=3,4,5$ and $N=2$ for $n=6$. The latter result ($N=2$ for $n=6$) shows that if six runners are considered starting from $0$ at time $t=0$ with constant speeds $v_0,v_1,\dots,v_{5}$ with $v_0=0$ and $v_1,\dots,v_{5}$ distinct and positive, then the static runner is separated by a distance at least $1/6$ from the others during the first two rounds of the slowest non-static runner (but not necessarily during the first round).

=== Other results ===
A much stronger result exists for randomly chosen speeds: using the stationary-runner convention, if $n$ and $\varepsilon>0$ are fixed and $n-1$ runners with nonzero speeds are chosen uniformly at random from $\{1,2,\ldots,k\}$, then $P(\delta\geq 1/2 - \varepsilon)\to 1$ as $k\to\infty$. In other words, runners with random speeds are likely at some point to be "very lonely"—nearly $1/2$ units from the nearest other runner. The full conjecture is true if "loneliness" is replaced with "almost aloneness", meaning at most one other runner is within $1/n$ of a given runner. The conjecture has been generalized to an analog in algebraic function fields.

Beck, Hosten & Schymura (2019) modelled the conjecture through a polyhedron, which is defined as follows: for a positive vector $\mathbf{n}$ in $k$-dimensional space, the lonely runner polyhedron is
$$\left\{\mathbf{x} \in \R^k \colon \frac{n_i - kn_j}{k + 1} \le n_j x_i - n_i x_j \le \frac{k n_i - n_j}{k + 1}, 1 \le i < j \le k \right\},$$
and the lonely runner conjecture is equivalent to the statement that this polyhedron contains an integer point, for any $\mathbf{n}$ with distinct positive integer entries.

== Notes and references ==
=== Works cited ===
- Barajas, Javier; Serra, Oriol (2008a). "The lonely runner with seven runners". The Electronic Journal of Combinatorics. 15 (1): R48. doi:10.37236/772.
- ——; —— (September 2009). "On the chromatic number of circulant graphs". Discrete Mathematics. 309 (18): 5687–5696. doi:10.1016/j.disc.2008.04.041.
- Beck, Matthais; Hosten, Serkan; Schymura, Matthias (2019). "Lonely Runner Polyhedra" (PDF). Integers: The Electronic Journal of Combinatorial Number Theory. 19. arXiv:1606.01783v4.
- Betke, U.; Wills, J. M. (1972). "Untere schranken für zwei diophantische approximations-funktionen". Monatshefte für Mathematik. 76 (3): 214. doi:10.1007/BF01322924. S2CID 122549668.
- Bienia, Wojciech; Goddyn, Luis; Gvozdjak, Pavol; Sebő, András; Tarsi, Michael (January 1998). "Flows, view obstructions, and the lonely runner". Journal of Combinatorial Theory, Series B. 72 (1): 1–9. doi:10.1006/jctb.1997.1770.
- Bohman, Tom; Holzman, Ron; Kleitman, Dan (February 2001). "Six lonely runners". The Electronic Journal of Combinatorics. 8 (2): R3. doi:10.37236/1602.
- Chen, Yong-Gao; Cusick, T. W. (January 1999). "The view-obstruction problem for n-dimensional cubes". Journal of Number Theory. 74 (1): 126–133. doi:10.1006/jnth.1998.2309.
- Chow, Sam; Rimanić, Luka (January 2019). "Lonely runners in function fields" (PDF). Mathematika. 65 (3): 677–701. arXiv:1711.01207. doi:10.1112/S002557931900007X. S2CID 118621899.
- Cusick, T. W. (1973). "View-obstruction problems". Aequationes Mathematicae. 9 (2–3): 165–170. doi:10.1007/BF01832623. S2CID 122050409.
- —— (1974). "View-obstruction problems in n-dimensional geometry". Journal of Combinatorial Theory, Series A. 16 (1): 1–11. doi:10.1016/0097-3165(74)90066-1.
- ——; Pomerance, Carl (1984). "View-obstruction problems, III". Journal of Number Theory. 19 (2): 131–139. doi:10.1016/0022-314X(84)90097-0.
- Czerwiński, Sebastian (2012). "Random runners are very lonely". Journal of Combinatorial Theory, Series A. 119 (6): 1194–1199. arXiv:1102.4464. doi:10.1016/j.jcta.2012.02.002. S2CID 26415692.
- —— (May 2018). "The lonely runner problem for lacunary sequences". Discrete Mathematics. 341 (5): 1301–1306. doi:10.1016/j.disc.2018.02.002.
- ——; Grytczuk, Jarosław (September 2008). "Invisible runners in finite fields". Information Processing Letters. 108 (2): 64–67. doi:10.1016/j.ipl.2008.03.019.
- Dubickas, A. (2011). "The lonely runner problem for many runners". Glasnik Matematicki. 46: 25–30. doi:10.3336/gm.46.1.05.
- Goddyn, L.; Wong, Erick B. (2006). "Tight instances of the lonely runner" (PDF). Integers. 6 (A38).
- Kravitz, N. (2021). "Barely lonely runners and very lonely runners: a refined approach to the Lonely Runner Problem". Combinatorial Theory. 1. arXiv:1912.06034. doi:10.5070/C61055383. S2CID 245100000.
- Malikiosis, Romanos D.; Santos, Francisco; Schymura, Matthias (2025). "Linearly-exponential checking is enough for the Lonely Runner Conjecture and some of its variants". Forum of Mathematics, Sigma. 13 e164: 1–32. arXiv:2411.06903. doi:10.1017/fms.2025.10107.
- Perarnau, Guillem; Serra, Oriol (March 2016). "Correlation among runners and some results on the lonely runner conjecture". The Electronic Journal of Combinatorics. 23 (1): P1.50. arXiv:1407.3381. doi:10.37236/5123. S2CID 7039062.
- Renault, J. (2004). "View-obstruction: A shorter proof for 6 lonely runners". Discrete Mathematics. 287 (1–3): 93–101. doi:10.1016/j.disc.2004.06.008.
- Rifford, L. (2022). "On the time for a runner to get lonely". Acta Applicandae Mathematicae. 180 15: Paper No. 15. arXiv:2111.13688. doi:10.1007/s10440-022-00515-9.
- Rosenfeld, Matthieu (2025a). "The lonely runner conjecture holds for eight runners". arXiv:2509.14111 [math.CO].
- Rosenfeld, Matthieu (2025b). "The lonely runner conjecture holds for nine runners". arXiv:2512.01912 [cs.DM].
- Tao, Terence (31 December 2018). "Some remarks on the lonely runner conjecture". Contributions to Discrete Mathematics. 13 (2): No 2 (2018). doi:10.11575/cdm.v13i2.62728.
- Trakulthongchai, Tanupat (2025). "Nine and ten lonely runners". arXiv:2511.22427 [math.CO].
- Sungkawichai, Touch; Trakulthongchai, Tanupat (2026). "Eleven, twelve, and thirteen lonely runners". arXiv:2604.23906 [math.CO].
- Wills, Jörg M. (1967). "Zwei sätze über inhomogene diophantische approximation von irrationalzehlen". Monatshefte für Mathematik. 71 (3): 263–269. doi:10.1007/BF01298332. S2CID 122754182.
