= Exponential constant =

Exponential constant may refer to:

- e (mathematical constant)
- The growth or decay constant in exponential growth or exponential decay, respectively.
