= Kronecker's theorem =

Theorem about Diophantine approximations

In mathematics, Kronecker's theorem is a theorem about diophantine approximation, introduced by Leopold Kronecker (1884).

Kronecker's approximation theorem had been firstly proved by L. Kronecker in the end of the 19th century. It has been now revealed to relate to the idea of n-torus and Mahler measure since the later half of the 20th century. In terms of physical systems, it has the consequence that planets in circular orbits moving uniformly around a star will, over time, assume all alignments, unless there is an exact dependency between their orbital periods.

== Statement ==
Kronecker's theorem is a result about Diophantine approximations that generalizes Dirichlet's approximation theorem to multiple variables.

The Kronecker approximation theorem is classically formulated as follows.

Given real n-tuples $\alpha_i=(\alpha_{i 1},\dots,\alpha_{i n})\in\mathbb{R}^n, i=1,\dots,m$ and $\beta=(\beta_1,\dots,\beta_n)\in \mathbb{R}^n$ , the condition:

$$\forall \epsilon > 0 \, \exists q_i, p_j \in \mathbb Z : \biggl| \sum^m_{i=1}q_i\alpha_{ij}-p_j-\beta_j\biggr|<\epsilon,  1\le j\le n$$

holds if and only if for any $r_1,\dots,r_n\in\mathbb{Z},\ i=1,\dots,m$ with

$$\sum^n_{j=1}\alpha_{ij}r_j\in\mathbb{Z}, \ \ i=1,\dots,m\ ,$$

the number $\sum^n_{j=1}\beta_jr_j$ is also an integer.

In plainer language, the first condition states that the tuple $\beta = (\beta_1, \ldots, \beta_n)$ can be approximated arbitrarily well by linear combinations of the $\alpha_i$s (with integer coefficients) and integer vectors.

For the case of a $m=1$ and $n=1$, Kronecker's theorem can be stated as follows. For any $\alpha, \beta, \epsilon \in \mathbb{R}$ with $\alpha$ irrational and $\epsilon > 0$ there exist integers $p$ and $q$ with $q>0$, such that

$$|\alpha q - p - \beta| < \epsilon.$$

== Relation to tori ==
In the case of N numbers, taken as a single N-tuple and point P of the torus

T = R^{N}/Z^{N},

the closure of the subgroup <P> generated by P will be finite, or some torus T′ contained in T. The original Kronecker's theorem (Leopold Kronecker, 1884) stated that the necessary condition for

T′ = T,

which is that the numbers x_{i} together with 1 should be linearly independent over the rational numbers, is also sufficient. Here it is easy to see that if some linear combination of the x_{i} and 1 with non-zero rational number coefficients is zero, then the coefficients may be taken as integers, and a character χ of the group T other than the trivial character takes the value 1 on P. By Pontryagin duality we have T′ contained in the kernel of χ, and therefore not equal to T.

In fact a thorough use of Pontryagin duality here shows that the whole Kronecker theorem describes the closure of <P> as the intersection of the kernels of the χ with

χ(P) = 1.

This gives an (antitone) Galois connection between monogenic closed subgroups of T (those with a single generator, in the topological sense), and sets of characters with kernel containing a given point. Not all closed subgroups occur as monogenic; in particular, the (necessarily finite) quotient of a monogenic subgroup by the connected component of the identity element must be cyclic.

The theorem leaves open the question of how well (uniformly) the multiples mP of P fill up the closure. In the one-dimensional case, the distribution is uniform by the equidistribution theorem.

== See also ==
- Weyl's criterion for equidistributed sequences
- Dirichlet's approximation theorem
