= Alexander Bruno =

Russian mathematician

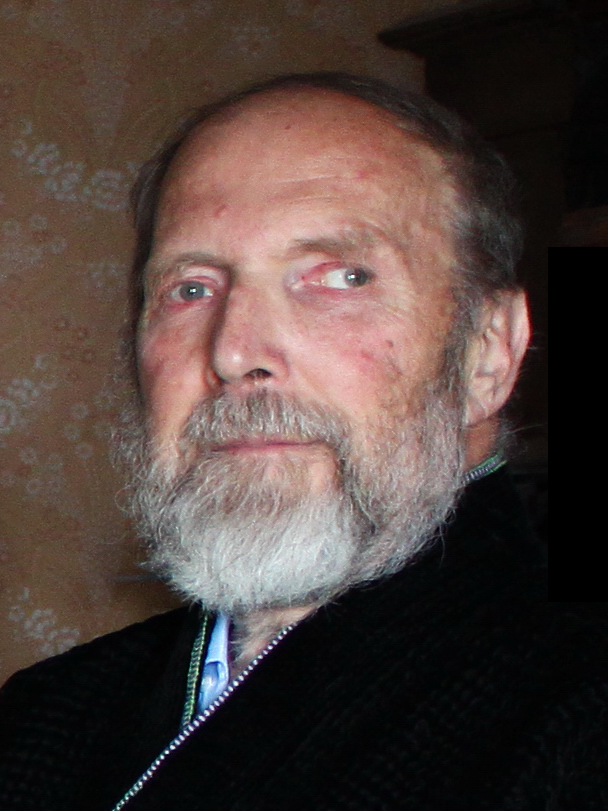
Bruno

Alexander Dmitrievich Bruno (Russian: Александр Дмитриевич Брюно) (26 June 1940, Moscow) is a Russian mathematician who has made contributions to the normal forms theory. Bruno developed a new level of mathematical analysis and called it "power geometry". He also applied it to the solution of several problems in mathematics, mechanics, celestial mechanics, and hydrodynamics. The Brjuno numbers were introduced by him in 1971, and are named after him.

Bruno won third prize at the Moscow Mathematical Olympiade in 1956 and first prize in 1957. He studied at Moscow State University, where he won second prizes for student papers in 1960 and 1961, and earned a master's degree there in 1962. He completed a doctorate from Kishinev State University in 1966. He began working at the Keldysh Institute of Applied Mathematics in 1965, became full professor there 1970, and in 2007 also became a professor at Moscow State University.

== Selected publications ==
- Analytical form of differential equations (I, II). Trans. Moscow Math. Soc. 25 (1971) 131–288, 26 (1972) 199–239
- Local Methods in Nonlinear Differential Equations. Springer-Verlag: Berlin-Heidelberg-New York-London-Paris-Tokyo, 1989. 350 pp.
- The Restricted 3-Body Problem: Plane Periodic Orbits. Walter de Gruyter, Berlin-New York, 1994. 362 pp.
- Power Geometry in Algebraic and Differential Equations. Elsevier Science (North-Holland), Amsterdam, 2000. 395 pp
