= Flint Hills series =

The Flint Hills series, named after the Flint Hills in Kansas, is an elementary series whose convergence is not yet known/proven.

$\sum_{n=1}^\infty \frac{\csc^{2} n}{n^{3}}$ or $\sum_{n=1}^\infty \frac{1}{n^{3} \sin^{2} n}$

Alekseyev (2011) proved criteria of convergence ot this series. Its converence is closely related on irrationality measure of π. If the irrationality measure of $\pi$ is smaller than 2.5, the series converges. If the irrationality measure of pi is bigger than 2.5, the series diverges. The borderline 2.5 is much smaller than the best upper bound at that time, 7.6063....

The current bound of π's irrationality measure is 7.103205334137 which is far from 2.5.

The 2026 OpenAI bulk release of mathematical papers included an unverified proof of the claim that the irrationality measure of π is exactly 2. The proof is currently undergoing verification by the mathematical community. If verified, this will establish convergence of the series.

== Generalization ==
There are generalizations of Flint Hills series by changing exponent or period of sine function or both.

== See Also ==
- Flint Hills
