= Heilbronn set =

In mathematics, a Heilbronn set is an infinite set S of natural numbers for which every real number can be arbitrarily closely approximated by a fraction whose denominator is in S. For any given real number $\theta$ and natural number $h$, it is easy to find the integer $g$ such that $g/h$ is closest to $\theta$. For example, for the real number $\pi$ and $h=100$ we have $g=314$. If we call the closeness of $\theta$ to $g/h$ the difference between $h\theta$ and $g$, the closeness is always less than 1/2 (in our example it is 0.15926...). A collection of numbers is a Heilbronn set if for any $\theta$ we can always find a sequence of values for $h$ in the set where the closeness tends to zero.

More mathematically let $\|\alpha\|$ denote the distance from $\alpha$ to the nearest integer then $\mathcal H$ is a Heilbronn set if and only if for every real number $\theta$ and every $\varepsilon>0$ there exists $h\in\mathcal H$ such that $\|h\theta\|<\varepsilon$.

== Examples ==
The natural numbers are a Heilbronn set as Dirichlet's approximation theorem shows that there exists $q<[1/\varepsilon]$ with $\|q\theta\|<\varepsilon$.

The $k$th powers of integers are a Heilbronn set. This follows from a result of I. M. Vinogradov who showed that for every $N$ and $k$ there exists an exponent $\eta_k>0$ and $q<N$ such that $\|q^k\theta\|\ll N^{-\eta_k}$. In the case $k=2$ Hans Heilbronn was able to show that $\eta_2$ may be taken arbitrarily close to 1/2. Alexandru Zaharescu has improved Heilbronn's result to show that $\eta_2$ may be taken arbitrarily close to 4/7.

Any Van der Corput set is also a Heilbronn set.

== Example of a non-Heilbronn set ==
The powers of 10 are not a Heilbronn set. Take $\varepsilon=0.001$ then the statement that $\|10^k\theta\|<\varepsilon$ for some $k$ is equivalent to saying that the decimal expansion of $\theta$ has run of three zeros or three nines somewhere. This is not true for all real numbers.
