= Hurwitz's theorem (number theory) =

Theorem in number theory that gives a bound on a Diophantine approximation

In number theory, Hurwitz's theorem, named after Adolf Hurwitz, gives a bound on a Diophantine approximation. The theorem states that for every irrational number ξ there are infinitely many relatively prime integers m, n such that
$$\left |\xi-\frac{m}{n}\right | < \frac{1}{\sqrt{5}\, n^2}.$$

The condition that ξ is irrational cannot be omitted. Moreover, the constant $\sqrt{5}$ is the best possible; if we replace $\sqrt{5}$ by any number $A > \sqrt{5}$ and we let $\xi = (1+\sqrt{5})/2$ (the golden ratio) then there exist only finitely many relatively prime integers m, n such that the formula above holds.

The theorem is equivalent to the claim that the Markov constant of every number is larger than $\sqrt{5}$.

== See also ==
- Dirichlet's approximation theorem
- Lagrange number
