= Lagrange number =

Type of number related to Diophantine approximation

In mathematics, the Lagrange numbers (A382098 and A382099 in the OEIS) are a sequence of numbers that appear in bounds relating to the approximation of irrational numbers by rational numbers. They are linked to Hurwitz's theorem.

== Definition ==
Hurwitz improved Peter Gustav Lejeune Dirichlet's criterion on irrationality to the statement that a real number $\alpha$ is irrational if and only if there are infinitely many rational numbers $\frac pq$, written in simplest terms, such that

$\left|\alpha - \frac{p}{q}\right| < \frac{1}{\sqrt{5}q^2}$.

This was an improvement on Dirichlet's result which had $\frac1{q^2}$ on the right-hand side. The above result is best possible, since the golden ratio $\varphi$ is irrational. If we replace $\sqrt5$ with any larger number in the above expression, we will only be able to find finitely many rational numbers that satisfy the inequality for $\alpha=\varphi$.

Hurwitz also showed that if we omit $\varphi$ (and numbers derived therefrom), we can increase the $\sqrt5$ to $2\sqrt2$. Again this new bound is best possible, this time with $\sqrt2$ being the problem. If we omit$\sqrt2$, we can further increase the $2\sqrt2$ to $\frac\sqrt{221}5$. Repeating this process we get the infinite series $\sqrt5,\;2\sqrt2,\;\frac\sqrt{221}5,\;\frac\sqrt{1517}{13},\;\ldots$ which converges to 3. These are the Lagrange numbers, named after Joseph Louis Lagrange.

== Relation to Markov numbers ==
The $n$th Lagrange number $L_n$ is given by

$$L_n=\sqrt{9-\frac4{M_n^2}}$$

where $M_n$ is the $n$th Markov number—the $n$th-smallest integer $m$ such that the equation

$$m^2+x^2+y^2=3mxy$$

has a solution in positive integers $x$ and $y$.
