= Markov number =

Solution to x*x + y*y + z*z = 3xyz

A Markov number or Markoff number is a positive integer x, y or z that is part of a solution to the Markov Diophantine equation

$$x^2 + y^2 + z^2 = 3xyz,\,$$

studied by Andrey Markoff (1879, 1880).

The first few Markov numbers are

1, 2, 5, 13, 29, 34, 89, 169, 194, 233, 433, 610, 985, 1325, ... (sequence A002559 in the OEIS)

appearing as coordinates of the Markov triples

(1, 1, 1), (1, 1, 2), (1, 2, 5), (1, 5, 13), (2, 5, 29), (1, 13, 34), (1, 34, 89), (2, 29, 169), (5, 13, 194), (1, 89, 233), (5, 29, 433), (1, 233, 610), (2, 169, 985), (13, 34, 1325), ...

There are infinitely many Markov numbers and Markov triples.

== Markov tree ==
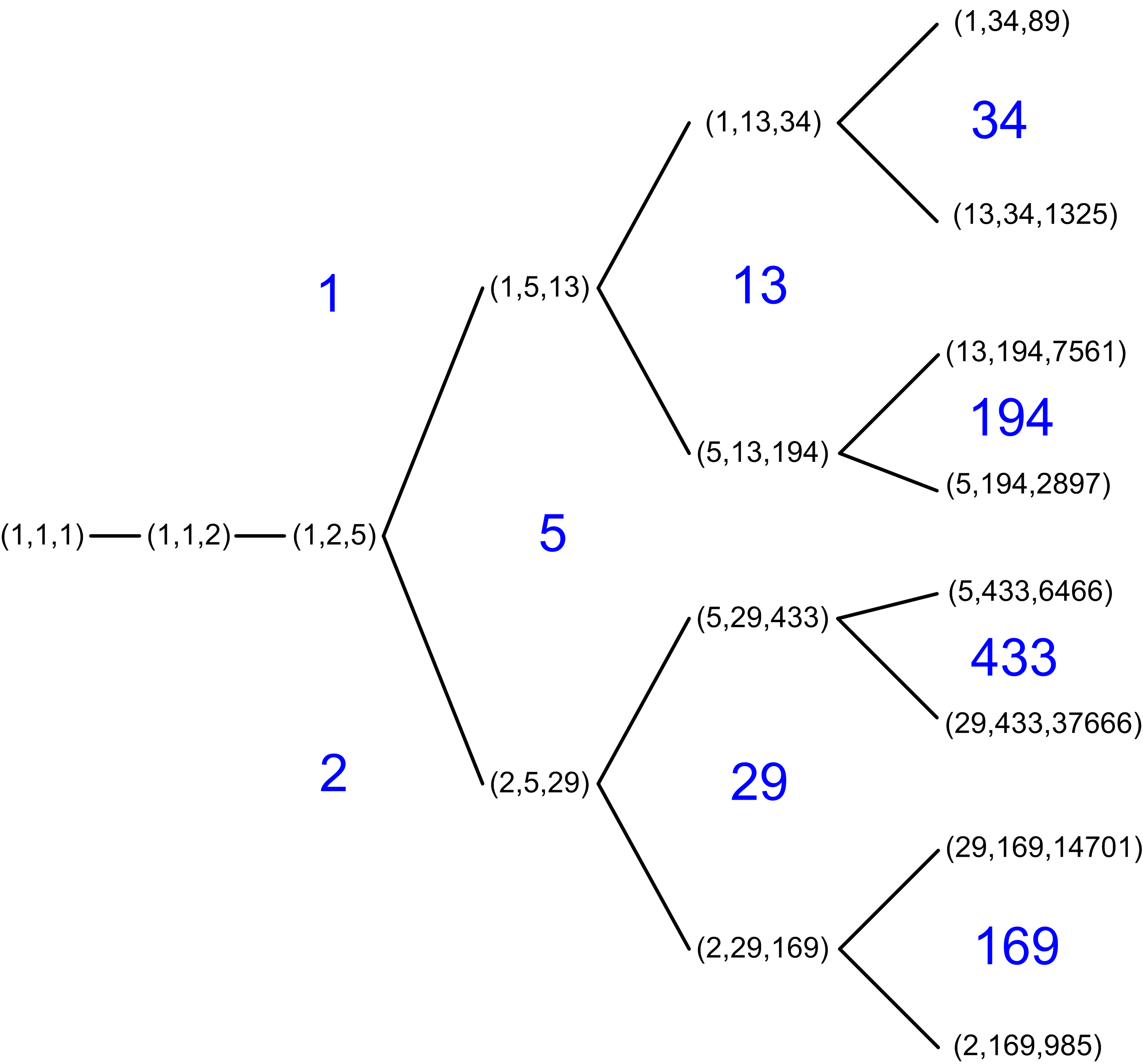
The first levels of the Markov number tree

There are two simple ways to obtain a new Markov triple from an old one (x, y, z). First, one may permute the 3 numbers x,y,z, so in particular one can normalize the triples so that x ≤ y ≤ z. Second, if (x, y, z) is a Markov triple then so is (x, y, 3xy − z). Applying this operation twice returns the same triple one started with. Joining each normalized Markov triple to the 1, 2, or 3 normalized triples one can obtain from this gives a graph starting from (1,1,1) as in the diagram. This graph is connected; in other words every Markov triple can be connected to (1,1,1) by a sequence of these operations. If one starts, as an example, with (1, 5, 13) we get its three neighbors (5, 13, 194), (1, 13, 34) and (1, 2, 5) in the Markov tree if z is set to 1, 5 and 13, respectively. For instance, starting with (1, 1, 2) and trading y and z before each iteration of the transform lists Markov triples with Fibonacci numbers. Starting with that same triplet and trading x and z before each iteration gives the triples with Pell numbers.

All the Markov numbers on the regions adjacent to 2's region are odd-indexed Pell numbers (or numbers n such that 2n^{2} − 1 is a square, OEIS: A001653), and all the Markov numbers on the regions adjacent to 1's region are odd-indexed Fibonacci numbers (OEIS: A001519). Thus, there are infinitely many Markov triples of the form

$$(1, F_{2n-1}, F_{2n+1}),\,$$

where F_{k} is the kth Fibonacci number. Likewise, there are infinitely many Markov triples of the form

$$(2, P_{2n-1}, P_{2n+1}),\,$$

where P_{k} is the kth Pell number.

== Other properties ==
Aside from the two smallest singular triples (1, 1, 1) and (1, 1, 2), every Markov triple consists of three distinct integers.

The unicity conjecture, as remarked by Frobenius in 1913, states that for a given Markov number c, there is exactly one normalized solution having c as its largest element: proofs of this conjecture have been claimed but none seems to be correct. Martin Aigner examines several weaker variants of the unicity conjecture. His fixed numerator conjecture was proved by Rabideau and Schiffler in 2020, while the fixed denominator conjecture and fixed sum conjecture were proved by Lee, Li, Rabideau and Schiffler in 2023.

None of the prime divisors of a Markov number is congruent to 3 modulo 4, which implies that an odd Markov number is 1 more than a multiple of 4. Furthermore, if $m$ is a Markov number then none of the prime divisors of $9m^2-4$ is congruent to 3 modulo 4. An even Markov number is 2 more than a multiple of 32.

In his 1982 paper, Don Zagier conjectured that the nth Markov number is asymptotically given by

$$m_n = \tfrac13 e^{C\sqrt{n+o(1)}} \quad\text{with } C = 2.3523414972 \ldots\,.$$

The error $o(1) = (\log(3m_n)/C)^2 - n$ is plotted below.

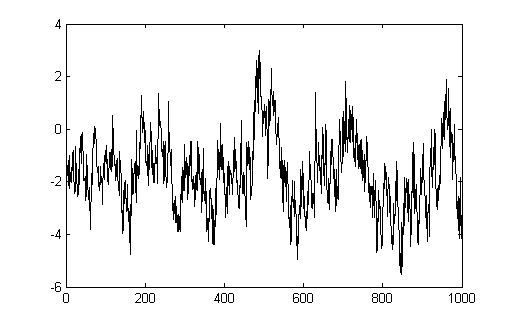
Error in the approximation of large Markov numbers

Moreover, he pointed out that $x^2 + y^2 + z^2 = 3xyz + 4/9$, an approximation of the original Diophantine equation, is equivalent to $f(x)+f(y)=f(z)$ with $f(t) =$ arcosh$(3t/2).$ The conjecture was proved by Greg McShane and Igor Rivin in 1995 using techniques from hyperbolic geometry.

The nth Lagrange number can be calculated from the nth Markov number with the formula

$$L_n = \sqrt{9 - {4 \over {m_n}^2}}.\,$$

The Markov numbers are sums of (non-unique) pairs of squares.

== Markov's theorem ==
Markoff (1879, 1880) showed that if

$$f(x,y) = ax^2+bxy+cy^2$$

is an indefinite binary quadratic form with real coefficients and discriminant $D = b^2-4ac$, then there are integers x, y for which f takes a nonzero value of absolute value at most

$$\frac{\sqrt D}{3}$$

unless f is a Markov form: a constant times a form

$$px^2+(3p-2a)xy+(b-3a)y^2$$

such that

$$\begin{cases} 0<a<p/2,\\
aq\equiv\pm r\pmod p,\\
bp-a^2=1,
\end{cases}$$

where (p, q, r) is a Markov triple.

== Matrices ==
Let tr denote the trace function over matrices. If X and Y are in SL_{2}($\mathbb{C}$), then

$$\operatorname{tr}(X) \operatorname{tr}(Y) \operatorname{tr}(XY) + \operatorname{tr}(XYX^{-1}Y^{-1}) + 2 = \operatorname{tr}(X)^2 + \operatorname{tr}(Y)^2 + \operatorname{tr}(XY)^2$$

so that if $\operatorname{tr}(XYX^{-1}Y^{-1}) = -2$ then

$$\operatorname{tr}(X) \operatorname{tr}(Y) \operatorname{tr}(XY) = \operatorname{tr}(X)^2 + \operatorname{tr}(Y)^2 + \operatorname{tr}(XY)^2$$

In particular if X and Y also have integer entries then tr(X)/3, tr(Y)/3, and tr(XY)/3 are a Markov triple. If X⋅Y⋅Z = I then tr(XtY) = tr(Z), so more symmetrically if X, Y, and Z are in SL_{2}($\mathbb{Z}$) with X⋅Y⋅Z = I and the commutator of two of them has trace −2, then their traces/3 are a Markov triple.

== See also ==
- Markov spectrum
