= Thue's theorem =

Thue's theorem may refer to the following mathematical theorems named after Axel Thue:

- Thue equation has finitely many solutions in integers.
- Thue's lemma, which asserts that every modular integer may be written as a modular fraction with numerator and denominator bounded by the square root of the modulus.
- Thue–Siegel–Roth theorem, also known as Roth's theorem, is a foundational result in diophantine approximation to algebraic numbers.
- The 2-dimensional analog of Kepler's conjecture: the regular hexagonal packing is the densest circle packing in the plane (1890).
