= Szpiro's conjecture =

Conjecture in number theory

Modified Szpiro conjecture
- Field: Number theory
- Conjectured by: Lucien Szpiro
- Conjectured in: 1981
- Equivalent to: abc conjecture
- Consequences: Beal conjecture; Faltings' theorem; Fermat's Last Theorem; Fermat–Catalan conjecture; Roth's theorem; Tijdeman's theorem

In number theory, Szpiro's conjecture relates the conductor of an elliptic curve to its discriminant. In a slightly modified form, it is equivalent to the well-known abc conjecture. It is named for Lucien Szpiro, who formulated it in the 1980s.

Szpiro's conjecture and its equivalent forms have been described as "the most important unsolved problem in Diophantine analysis", in part due to its large number of consequences in number theory including Roth's theorem, Faltings' theorem, the Fermat–Catalan conjecture, and Brocard's problem.

== Original statement ==
The conjecture states that given $\varepsilon > 0$, there exists a constant $C(\varepsilon)$ such that for any elliptic curve $E$ defined over $\Q$ with minimal discriminant $\Delta$ and conductor $f$,

$$\vert\Delta\vert \leq C(\varepsilon ) \cdot f^{6+\varepsilon}.$$

== Modified Szpiro conjecture ==
The modified Szpiro conjecture states that: given $\varepsilon > 0$, there exists a constant $C(\varepsilon)$ such that for any elliptic curve $E$ defined over $\Q$ with invariants $c_4$, $c_6$ and conductor $f$ (using notation from Tate's algorithm),

$$\max\{|c_4|^3, |c_6|^2\} \leq C(\varepsilon) \cdot f^{6+\varepsilon}.$$

=== abc conjecture ===
The abc conjecture originated as the outcome of attempts by Joseph Oesterlé and David Masser to understand Szpiro's conjecture, and was then shown to be equivalent to the modified Szpiro's conjecture.

== Consequences ==
Szpiro's conjecture and its modified form are known to imply several important mathematical results and conjectures, including Roth's theorem, Faltings' theorem, the Fermat–Catalan conjecture, and a negative solution to the Erdős–Ulam problem.

== Claimed proofs ==
In August 2012, Shinichi Mochizuki claimed a proof of Szpiro's conjecture by developing a new theory called inter-universal Teichmüller theory (IUTT). However, the papers have not been accepted by the mathematical community as providing a proof of the conjecture, with Peter Scholze and Jakob Stix concluding in March 2018 that they had issues "so severe that … small modifications will not rescue the proof strategy".

== See also ==
- Arakelov theory

== Bibliography ==
- Lang, S. (1997), Survey of Diophantine geometry, Berlin: Springer-Verlag, p. 51, ISBN 3-540-61223-8, Zbl 0869.11051
- Szpiro, L. (1981). "Propriétés numériques du faisceau dualisant rélatif". Seminaire sur les pinceaux des courbes de genre au moins deux (PDF). Astérisque. Vol. 86. pp. 44–78. Zbl 0517.14006.
- Szpiro, L. (1987), "Présentation de la théorie d'Arakelov", Contemp. Math., Contemporary Mathematics, vol. 67, pp. 279–293, doi:10.1090/conm/067/902599, ISBN 9780821850749, Zbl 0634.14012
