= Hodge–Arakelov theory =

Elliptic curves

In mathematics, Hodge–Arakelov theory of elliptic curves is an analogue of classical and p-adic Hodge theory for elliptic curves carried out in the framework of Arakelov theory. It was introduced by Mochizuki (1999). It bears the name of two mathematicians, Suren Arakelov and W. V. D. Hodge. The main comparison in this theory remains unpublished as of 2019.

Mochizuki's main comparison theorem in Hodge–Arakelov theory states (roughly) that the space of polynomial functions of degree less than d on the universal extension of a smooth elliptic curve in characteristic 0 is naturally isomorphic (via restriction) to the d ^{2}-dimensional space of functions on the d-torsion points. It is called a 'comparison theorem' as it is an analogue for Arakelov theory of comparison theorems in cohomology relating de Rham cohomology to singular cohomology of complex varieties or étale cohomology of p-adic varieties.

In Mochizuki (1999) and Mochizuki (2002a) he pointed out that arithmetic Kodaira–Spencer map and Gauss–Manin connection may give some important hints for Vojta's conjecture, ABC conjecture and so on; in 2012, he published his Inter-universal Teichmuller theory, in which he didn't use Hodge-Arakelov theory but used the theory of frobenioids, anabelioids and mono-anabelian geometry.

== See also ==
- Hodge theory
- Arakelov theory
- P-adic Hodge theory
- Inter-universal Teichmüller theory
