= Nilcurve =

In mathematics, a nilcurve is a pointed stable curve over a finite field with an indigenous bundle whose p-curvature is square nilpotent. Nilcurves were introduced by Mochizuki (1996) as a central concept in his theory of p-adic Teichmüller theory.

The nilcurves form a stack over the moduli stack of stable genus g curves with r marked points in characteristic p, of degree p^{3g–3+r}.
