= Abc conjecture =

Conjecture in number theory

abc conjecture
- Field: Number theory
- Conjectured by: Joseph Oesterlé; David Masser
- Conjectured in: 1985
- Equivalent to: Modified Szpiro conjecture
- Consequences: Beal conjecture; Erdős–Ulam problem; Faltings' theorem; Fermat's Last Theorem; Fermat–Catalan conjecture; Roth's theorem; Tijdeman's theorem

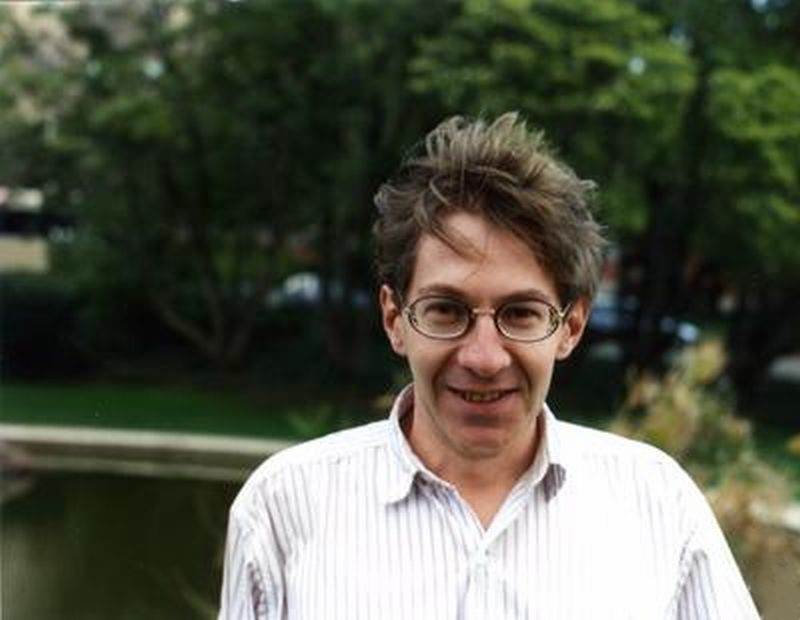
Mathematician Joseph Oesterlé

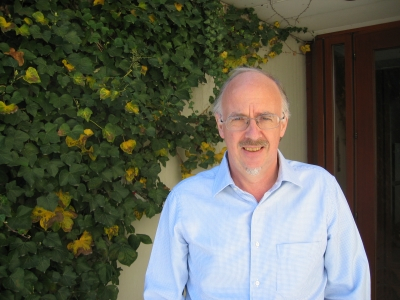
Mathematician David Masser

The abc conjecture (also known as the Oesterlé–Masser conjecture) is a conjecture in number theory that arose out of a discussion of Joseph Oesterlé and David Masser in 1985. It is stated in terms of three positive integers $a, b$ and $c$ (hence the name) that are relatively prime and satisfy $a+b=c$. The conjecture essentially states that the product of the distinct prime factors of $abc$ cannot often be much smaller than $c$. A number of famous conjectures and theorems in number theory would follow immediately from the abc conjecture or its versions. Mathematician Dorian Goldfeld described the abc conjecture as "The most important unsolved problem in Diophantine analysis".

The abc conjecture originated as the outcome of attempts by Oesterlé and Masser to understand the Szpiro conjecture about elliptic curves, which involves more geometric structures in its statement than the abc conjecture. The abc conjecture was shown to be equivalent to the modified Szpiro conjecture.

Various attempts to prove the abc conjecture have been made, but none have gained broad acceptance. Shinichi Mochizuki claimed to have a proof in 2012, but the conjecture is still regarded as unproven by the mainstream mathematical community.

== Formulations ==
Before stating the conjecture, the notion of the radical of an integer must be introduced: for a positive integer $n$, the radical of $n$, denoted $\text{rad}(n)$, is the product of the distinct prime factors of $n$. For example,
$$\begin{align}
\text{rad}(16) &= \text{rad}(2^4) = 2, \\
\text{rad}(17) &= 17, \\
\text{rad}(18) &= \text{rad}(2\cdot 3^2) = 2\cdot3 = 6, \\
\text{rad}(1000000) &= \text{rad}(2^6 \cdot 5^6) = 2\cdot5 = 10.
\end{align}$$

If a, b, and c are coprime (Note: When a + b = c, any common factor of two of the values is necessarily shared by the third. Thus, coprimality of a, b, c implies pairwise coprimality of a, b, c. So in this case, it does not matter which concept we use.) positive integers such that a + b = c, it turns out that "usually" $c<\text{rad}(abc)$. The abc conjecture deals with the exceptions. Specifically, it states that:

For every positive real number ε, there exist only finitely many triples (a, b, c) of coprime positive integers, with a + b = c, such that
$c > \operatorname{rad}(abc)^{1+\varepsilon}.$

An equivalent formulation is:

For every positive real number ε, there exists a constant K_{ε} such that for all triples (a, b, c) of coprime positive integers, with a + b = c:
$c < K_{\varepsilon} \cdot \operatorname{rad}(abc)^{1+\varepsilon}.$

Equivalently (using the little o notation):

For all triples (a, b, c) of coprime positive integers with a + b = c, rad(abc) is at least c^{1-o(1)}.

A fourth equivalent formulation of the conjecture involves the quality q(a, b, c) of the triple (a, b, c), which is defined as

$q(a, b, c) = \frac{\log(c)}{\log\big(\textrm{rad}(abc)\big)}.$

For example:

q(4, 127, 131) = log(131) / log(rad(4·127·131)) = log(131) / log(2·127·131) = 0.46820...

q(3, 125, 128) = log(128) / log(rad(3·125·128)) = log(128) / log(30) = 1.426565...

A typical triple (a, b, c) of coprime positive integers with a + b = c will have c < rad(abc), i.e. q(a, b, c) < 1. Triples with q > 1 such as in the second example are rather special; they consist of numbers divisible by high powers of small prime numbers. The fourth formulation is:

For every positive real number ε, there exist only finitely many triples (a, b, c) of coprime positive integers with a + b = c such that q(a, b, c) > 1 + ε.

Whereas it is known that there are infinitely many triples (a, b, c) of coprime positive integers with a + b = c such that q(a, b, c) > 1, the conjecture predicts that only finitely many of those have q > 1.01 or q > 1.001 or even q > 1.0001, etc. In particular, if the conjecture is true, then there must exist a triple (a, b, c) that achieves the maximal possible quality q(a, b, c).

== Examples of triples with small radical ==
The condition that ε > 0 is necessary as there exist infinitely many triples a, b, c with c > rad(abc). For example, let

$a = 1, \quad b = 2^{6n} - 1, \quad c = 2^{6n}, \qquad n > 1.$

The integer b is divisible by 9:

$b = 2^{6n} - 1 = 64^n - 1 = (64 - 1) (\cdots) = 9 \cdot 7 \cdot (\cdots).$

Using this fact, the following calculation is made:

$$\begin{align}
\operatorname{rad}(abc) &= \operatorname{rad}(a) \operatorname{rad}(b) \operatorname{rad}(c) \\
&= \operatorname{rad}(1)  \operatorname{rad} \left ( 2^{6n} -1 \right ) \operatorname{rad} \left (2^{6n} \right ) \\
&= 2 \operatorname{rad} \left ( 2^{6n} -1 \right ) \\
&= 2 \operatorname{rad} \left ( 9 \cdot \tfrac{b}{9} \right )  \\
&\leqslant 2 \cdot 3  \cdot \tfrac{b}{9} \\
&= \tfrac{2}{3} b \\
&< \tfrac{2}{3} c.
\end{align}$$

By replacing the exponent 6n with other exponents forcing b to have larger square factors, the ratio between the radical and c can be made arbitrarily small. Specifically, let p > 2 be a prime and consider

$a = 1, \quad b = 2^{p(p-1)n} - 1, \quad c = 2^{p(p-1)n}, \qquad n > 1.$

Now it may be plausibly claimed that b is divisible by p^{2}:

$$\begin{align}
b &= 2^{p(p-1)n} - 1 \\
&= \left(2^{p(p-1)}\right)^n - 1 \\
&= \left(2^{p(p-1)} - 1\right) (\cdots) \\
&= p^2 \cdot r (\cdots).
\end{align}$$

The last step uses the fact that p^{2} divides 2^{p(p−1)} − 1. This follows from Fermat's little theorem, which shows that, for p > 2, 2^{p−1} = pk + 1 for some integer k. Raising both sides to the power of p then shows that 2^{p(p−1)} = p^{2}(...) + 1.

And now with a similar calculation as above, the following results:

$\operatorname{rad}(abc) < \tfrac{2}{p} c.$

A list of the highest-quality triples (triples with a particularly small radical relative to c) is given below; the highest quality, 1.6299, was found by Eric Reyssat (Lando & Zvonkin 2004, p. 137) for

a = 2,
b = 3^{10}·109 = 6436341,
c = 23^{5} = 6436343,
rad(abc) = 15042.

== Consequences ==
The abc conjecture has a large number of consequences. These include both known results (some of which have been proven separately only since the conjecture has been stated) and conjectures for which it gives a conditional proof. The consequences include:

- Roth's theorem on Diophantine approximation of algebraic numbers.
- The Mordell conjecture (already proven in general by Gerd Faltings).
- As equivalent, Vojta's conjecture in dimension 1.
- The Erdős–Woods conjecture allowing for a finite number of counterexamples.
- The existence of infinitely many non-Wieferich primes in every base b > 1.
- The weak form of Marshall Hall's conjecture on the separation between squares and cubes of integers.
- Fermat's Last Theorem has a famously difficult proof by Andrew Wiles. However it follows easily, at least for $n \ge 6$, from an effective form of a weak version of the abc conjecture. The abc conjecture says the lim sup of the set of all qualities (defined above) is 1, which implies the much weaker assertion that there is a finite upper bound for qualities. The conjecture that 2 is such an upper bound suffices for a very short proof of Fermat's Last Theorem for $n \ge 6$.
- The Fermat–Catalan conjecture, a generalization of Fermat's Last Theorem concerning powers that are sums of powers.
- The L-function L(s, χ_{d}) formed with the Legendre symbol, has no Siegel zero, given a uniform version of the abc conjecture in number fields, not just the abc conjecture as formulated above for rational integers.
- A polynomial P(x) has only finitely many perfect powers for all integers x if P has at least three simple zeros.
- A generalization of Tijdeman's theorem concerning the number of solutions of y^{m} = x^{n} + k (Tijdeman's theorem answers the case k = 1), and Pillai's conjecture (1931) concerning the number of solutions of Ay^{m} = Bx^{n} + k.
- As equivalent, the Granville–Langevin conjecture, that if f is a square-free binary form of degree n > 2, then for every real β > 2 there is a constant C(f, β) such that for all coprime integers x, y, the radical of f(x, y) exceeds C · max{|x|, |y|}^{n−β}.
- All of the polynomials (x^{n}-1)/(x-1) have infinitely many square-free values.
- As equivalent, the modified Szpiro conjecture, which would yield a bound of rad(abc)^{1.2+ε}.
- Dąbrowski (1996) has shown that the abc conjecture implies that the Diophantine equation n! + A = k^{2} has only finitely many solutions for any given integer A.
- There are ~c_{f}N positive integers n ≤ N for which f(n)/B' is square-free, with c_{f} > 0 a positive constant defined as:
  $c_f = \prod_{\text{prime }p} x_i \left ( 1 - \frac{\omega\,\!_f (p)}{p^{2+q_p}} \right ).$
- The Beal conjecture, a generalization of Fermat's Last Theorem proposing that if A, B, C, x, y, and z are positive integers with A^{x} + B^{y} = C^{z} and x, y, z > 2, then A, B, and C have a common prime factor. The abc conjecture would imply that there are only finitely many counterexamples.
- Lang's conjecture, a lower bound for the height of a non-torsion rational point of an elliptic curve.
- A negative solution to the Erdős–Ulam problem on dense sets of Euclidean points with rational distances.
- An effective version of Siegel's theorem about integral points on algebraic curves.

== Theoretical results ==
The abc conjecture implies that c can be bounded above by a near-linear function of the radical of abc. Bounds are known that are exponential. Specifically, the following bounds have been proven:

$c < \exp{ \left(K_1 \operatorname{rad}(abc)^{15}\right) }$ (Stewart & Tijdeman 1986),
$c < \exp{ \left(K_2 \operatorname{rad}(abc)^{\frac{2}{3} + \varepsilon}\right) }$ (Stewart & Yu 1991), and
$c < \exp{ \left(K_3 \operatorname{rad}(abc)^{\frac{1}{3}}\left(\log(\operatorname{rad}(abc)\right)^3\right) }$ (Stewart & Yu 2001).

In these bounds, K_{1} and K_{3} are constants that do not depend on a, b, or c, and K_{2} is a constant that depends on ε (in an effectively computable way) but not on a, b, or c. The bounds apply to any triple for which c > 2.

There are also theoretical results that provide a lower bound on the best possible form of the abc conjecture. In particular, Stewart & Tijdeman (1986) showed that there are infinitely many triples (a, b, c) of coprime integers with a + b = c and

$c > \operatorname{rad}(abc) \exp{ \left(k \sqrt{\log c}/\log\log c \right) }$

for all k < 4. The constant k was improved to k = 6.068 by van Frankenhuysen (2000).

== Computational results ==
In 2006, the Mathematics Department of Leiden University in the Netherlands, together with the Dutch Kennislink science institute, launched the ABC@Home project, a grid computing system, which aims to discover additional triples a, b, c with rad(abc) < c. Although no finite set of examples or counterexamples can resolve the abc conjecture, it is hoped that patterns in the triples discovered by this project will lead to insights about the conjecture and about number theory more generally.

Distribution of triples with q > 1
q c	q > 1	q > 1.05	q > 1.1	q > 1.2	q > 1.3	q > 1.4
c < 10^{2}	6	4	4	2	0	0
c < 10^{3}	31	17	14	8	3	1
c < 10^{4}	120	74	50	22	8	3
c < 10^{5}	418	240	152	51	13	6
c < 10^{6}	1,268	667	379	102	29	11
c < 10^{7}	3,499	1,669	856	210	60	17
c < 10^{8}	8,987	3,869	1,801	384	98	25
c < 10^{9}	22,316	8,742	3,693	706	144	34
c < 10^{10}	51,677	18,233	7,035	1,159	218	51
c < 10^{11}	116,978	37,612	13,266	1,947	327	64
c < 10^{12}	252,856	73,714	23,773	3,028	455	74
c < 10^{13}	528,275	139,762	41,438	4,519	599	84
c < 10^{14}	1,075,319	258,168	70,047	6,665	769	98
c < 10^{15}	2,131,671	463,446	115,041	9,497	998	112
c < 10^{16}	4,119,410	812,499	184,727	13,118	1,232	126
c < 10^{17}	7,801,334	1,396,909	290,965	17,890	1,530	143
c < 10^{18}	14,482,065	2,352,105	449,194	24,013	1,843	160

As of May 2014, ABC@Home had found 23.8 million triples.

Highest-quality triples
Rank	q	a	b	c	Discovered by
1	1.6299	2	3^{10}·109	23^{5}	Eric Reyssat
2	1.6260	11^{2}	3^{2}·5^{6}·7^{3}	2^{21}·23	Benne de Weger
3	1.6235	19·1307	7·29^{2}·31^{8}	2^{8}·3^{22}·5^{4}	Jerzy Browkin, Juliusz Brzezinski
4	1.5808	283	5^{11}·13^{2}	2^{8}·3^{8}·17^{3}	Jerzy Browkin, Juliusz Brzezinski, Abderrahmane Nitaj
5	1.5679	1	2·3^{7}	5^{4}·7	Benne de Weger

Note: the quality q(a, b, c) of the triple (a, b, c) is defined above.

== Refined forms, generalizations and related statements ==
The abc conjecture is an integer analogue of the Mason–Stothers theorem for polynomials.

A strengthening, proposed by Baker (1998), states that in the abc conjecture one can replace rad(abc) by

ε^{−ω} rad(abc),

where ω is the total number of distinct primes dividing a, b and c.

Andrew Granville noticed that the minimum of the function $\big(\varepsilon^{-\omega}\operatorname{rad}(abc)\big)^{1+\varepsilon}$ over $\varepsilon > 0$ occurs when $\varepsilon = \frac{\omega}{\log\big(\operatorname{rad}(abc)\big)}.$

This inspired Baker (2004) to propose a sharper form of the abc conjecture, namely:

$c < \kappa \operatorname{rad}(abc) \frac{\Big(\log\big(\operatorname{rad}(abc)\big)\Big)^\omega}{\omega!}$

with κ an absolute constant. After some computational experiments he found that a value of $6/5$ was admissible for κ. This version is called the "explicit abc conjecture".

Baker (1998) also describes related conjectures of Andrew Granville that would give upper bounds on c of the form

$K^{\Omega(a b c)} \operatorname{rad}(a b c),$

where Ω(n) is the total number of prime factors of n, and

$O\big(\operatorname{rad}(a b c) \Theta(a b c)\big),$

where Θ(n) is the number of integers up to n divisible only by primes dividing n.

Robert, Stewart & Tenenbaum (2014) proposed a more precise inequality based on Robert & Tenenbaum (2013). Let k = rad(abc). They conjectured there is a constant C_{1} such that

$c < k \exp\left(4\sqrt{\frac{3\log k}{\log\log k}}\left(1+\frac{\log\log\log k}{2\log\log k}+\frac{C_{1}}{\log\log k}\right)\right)$

holds whereas there is a constant C_{2} such that

$c > k \exp\left(4\sqrt{\frac{3\log k}{\log\log k}}\left(1+\frac{\log\log\log k}{2\log\log k}+\frac{C_{2}}{\log\log k}\right)\right)$

holds infinitely often.

Browkin & Brzeziński (1994) formulated the n conjecture—a version of the abc conjecture involving n > 2 integers.

== Claimed proofs ==
Lucien Szpiro proposed a solution in 2007, but it was found to be incorrect shortly afterwards.

Since August 2012, Shinichi Mochizuki has claimed a proof of Szpiro's conjecture and therefore the abc conjecture. He released a series of four preprints developing a new theory he called inter-universal Teichmüller theory (IUTT), which is then applied to prove the abc conjecture. The papers have not been widely accepted by the mathematical community as providing a proof of abc. This is not only because of their length and the difficulty of understanding them, but also because at least one specific point in the argument has been identified as a gap by some other experts. Although a few mathematicians have vouched for the correctness of the proof and have attempted to communicate their understanding via workshops on IUTT, they have failed to convince the number theory community at large.

In March 2018, Peter Scholze and Jakob Stix visited Kyoto for discussions with Mochizuki. While they did not resolve the differences, they brought them into clearer focus. Scholze and Stix wrote a report asserting and explaining an error in the logic of the proof and claiming that the resulting gap was "so severe that ... small modifications will not rescue the proof strategy"; Mochizuki claimed that they misunderstood vital aspects of the theory and made invalid simplifications.

On April 3, 2020, two mathematicians from the Kyoto research institute where Mochizuki works announced that his claimed proof would be published in Publications of the Research Institute for Mathematical Sciences (RIMS), the institute's journal. Mochizuki is chief editor of the journal but recused himself from the review of the paper. The announcement was received with skepticism by Kiran Kedlaya and Edward Frenkel, as well as being described by Nature as "unlikely to move many researchers over to Mochizuki's camp". In March 2021, Mochizuki's claimed proof was published in RIMS.

== See also ==
- List of unsolved problems in mathematics

== Sources ==
- Baker, Alan (1998). "Logarithmic forms and the abc-conjecture". In Győry, Kálmán (ed.). Number theory. Diophantine, computational and algebraic aspects. Proceedings of the international conference, Eger, Hungary, July 29-August 2, 1996. Berlin: de Gruyter. pp. 37–44. ISBN 3-11-015364-5. Zbl 0973.11047.
- Baker, Alan (2004). "Experiments on the abc-conjecture". Publicationes Mathematicae Debrecen. 65 (3–4): 253–260. doi:10.5486/PMD.2004.3348. S2CID 253834357. Archived from the original on 2021-09-12.
- Bombieri, Enrico (1994). "Roth's theorem and the abc-conjecture" (Preprint). ETH Zürich.
- Bombieri, Enrico; Gubler, Walter (2006). Heights in Diophantine Geometry. New Mathematical Monographs. Vol. 4. Cambridge University Press. ISBN 978-0-521-71229-3. Zbl 1130.11034.
- Browkin, Jerzy; Brzeziński, Juliusz (1994). "Some remarks on the abc-conjecture". Math. Comp. 62 (206): 931–939. Bibcode:1994MaCom..62..931B. doi:10.2307/2153551. JSTOR 2153551.
- Browkin, Jerzy (2000). "The abc-conjecture". In Bambah, R. P.; Dumir, V. C.; Hans-Gill, R. J. (eds.). Number Theory. Trends in Mathematics. Basel: Birkhäuser. pp. 75–106. ISBN 3-7643-6259-6.
- Dąbrowski, Andrzej (1996). "On the diophantine equation x! + A = y^{2}". Nieuw Archief voor Wiskunde, IV. 14: 321–324. Zbl 0876.11015.
- Elkies, N. D. (1991). "ABC implies Mordell". International Mathematics Research Notices. 1991 (7): 99–109. doi:10.1155/S1073792891000144.
- Frey, Gerhard (1997). "On Ternary Equations of Fermat Type and Relations with Elliptic Curves". Modular Forms and Fermat's Last Theorem. New York: Springer. pp. 527–548. ISBN 0-387-94609-8.
- Goldfeld, Dorian (1996). "Beyond the last theorem". Math Horizons. 4 (September): 26–34. doi:10.1080/10724117.1996.11974985. JSTOR 25678079.
- Goldfeld, Dorian (2002). "Modular forms, elliptic curves and the abc-conjecture". In Wüstholz, Gisbert (ed.). A panorama in number theory or The view from Baker's garden. Based on a conference in honor of Alan Baker's 60th birthday, Zürich, Switzerland, 1999. Cambridge: Cambridge University Press. pp. 128–147. ISBN 0-521-80799-9. Zbl 1046.11035.
- Gowers, Timothy; Barrow-Green, June; Leader, Imre, eds. (2008). The Princeton Companion to Mathematics. Princeton: Princeton University Press. pp. 361–362, 681. ISBN 978-0-691-11880-2.
- Granville, A. (1998). "ABC Allows Us to Count Squarefrees" (PDF). International Mathematics Research Notices. 1998 (19): 991–1009. doi:10.1155/S1073792898000592.
- Granville, Andrew; Stark, H. (2000). "ABC implies no "Siegel zeros" for L-functions of characters with negative exponent" (PDF). Inventiones Mathematicae. 139 (3): 509–523. Bibcode:2000InMat.139..509G. doi:10.1007/s002229900036. S2CID 6901166.
- Granville, Andrew; Tucker, Thomas (2002). "It's As Easy As abc" (PDF). Notices of the AMS. 49 (10): 1224–1231.
- Guy, Richard K. (2004). Unsolved Problems in Number Theory. Berlin: Springer-Verlag. ISBN 0-387-20860-7.
- Lando, Sergei K.; Zvonkin, Alexander K. (2004). "Graphs on Surfaces and Their Applications". Encyclopaedia of Mathematical Sciences: Lower-Dimensional Topology II. Vol. 141. Springer-Verlag. ISBN 3-540-00203-0.
- Langevin, M. (1993). "Cas d'égalité pour le théorème de Mason et applications de la conjecture abc". Comptes rendus de l'Académie des sciences (in French). 317 (5): 441–444.
- Masser, D. W. (1985). "Open problems". In Chen, W. W. L. (ed.). Proceedings of the Symposium on Analytic Number Theory. London: Imperial College.
- Mollin, R.A. (2009). "A note on the ABC-conjecture" (PDF). Far East Journal of Mathematical Sciences. 33 (3): 267–275. ISSN 0972-0871. Zbl 1241.11034. Archived from the original (PDF) on 2016-03-04.
- Mollin, Richard A. (2010). Advanced number theory with applications. Boca Raton, FL: CRC Press. ISBN 978-1-4200-8328-6. Zbl 1200.11002.
- Nitaj, Abderrahmane (1996). "La conjecture abc". Enseign. Math. (in French). 42 (1–2): 3–24.
- Oesterlé, Joseph (1988), "Nouvelles approches du "théorème" de Fermat", Astérisque, Séminaire Bourbaki exp 694 (161): 165–186, ISSN 0303-1179, MR 0992208
- Pomerance, Carl (2008). "Computational Number Theory". The Princeton Companion to Mathematics. Princeton University Press. pp. 361–362.
- Silverman, Joseph H. (1988). "Wieferich's criterion and the abc-conjecture". Journal of Number Theory. 30 (2): 226–237. doi:10.1016/0022-314X(88)90019-4. Zbl 0654.10019.
- Robert, Olivier; Stewart, Cameron L.; Tenenbaum, Gérald (2014). "A refinement of the abc conjecture" (PDF). Bulletin of the London Mathematical Society. 46 (6): 1156–1166. doi:10.1112/blms/bdu069. S2CID 123460044.
- Robert, Olivier; Tenenbaum, Gérald (November 2013). "Sur la répartition du noyau d'un entier" [On the distribution of the kernel of an integer]. Indagationes Mathematicae (in French). 24 (4): 802–914. doi:10.1016/j.indag.2013.07.007.
- Stewart, C. L.; Tijdeman, R. (1986). "On the Oesterlé-Masser conjecture". Monatshefte für Mathematik. 102 (3): 251–257. doi:10.1007/BF01294603. S2CID 123621917.
- Stewart, C. L.; Yu, Kunrui (1991). "On the abc conjecture". Mathematische Annalen. 291 (1): 225–230. doi:10.1007/BF01445201. S2CID 123894587.
- Stewart, C. L.; Yu, Kunrui (2001). "On the abc conjecture, II". Duke Mathematical Journal. 108 (1): 169–181. doi:10.1215/S0012-7094-01-10815-6.
- van Frankenhuysen, Machiel (2000). "A Lower Bound in the abc Conjecture". J. Number Theory. 82 (1): 91–95. doi:10.1006/jnth.1999.2484. MR 1755155.
- Van Frankenhuijsen, Machiel (2002). "The ABC conjecture implies Vojta's height inequality for curves". J. Number Theory. 95 (2): 289–302. doi:10.1006/jnth.2001.2769. MR 1924103.
- Waldschmidt, Michel (2015). "Lecture on the abc Conjecture and Some of Its Consequences" (PDF). Mathematics in the 21st Century. Springer Proceedings in Mathematics & Statistics. Vol. 98. pp. 211–230. doi:10.1007/978-3-0348-0859-0_13. ISBN 978-3-0348-0858-3.
