= Inter-universal Teichmüller theory =

Mathematical theory by Shinichi Mochizuki

Inter-universal Teichmüller theory (IUT or IUTT) is the name given by mathematician Shinichi Mochizuki to a theory he developed in the 2000s, following his earlier work in arithmetic geometry. According to Mochizuki, it is "an arithmetic version of Teichmüller theory for number fields equipped with an elliptic curve". The theory was made public in a series of four preprints posted in 2012 to his website. The most striking claimed application of the theory is to provide a proof for various outstanding conjectures in number theory, in particular the abc conjecture. Mochizuki and a few other mathematicians claim that the theory indeed yields such a proof but this has so far not been accepted by the mathematical community.

== History ==
The theory was developed entirely by Mochizuki up to 2012, and the last parts were written up in a series of four preprints. Mochizuki made his work public in August 2012 with none of the fanfare that typically accompanies major advances, posting the papers only to his institution's preprint server and his website, and making no announcement to colleagues. Soon after, the papers were picked up by Akio Tamagawa and Ivan Fesenko and the mathematical community at large was made aware of the claims to have proven the abc conjecture.

The reception of the claim was at first enthusiastic, though number theorists were baffled by the original language introduced and used by Mochizuki. Workshops on IUT were held at the Research Institute for Mathematical Sciences (RIMS) in March 2015, in Beijing in July 2015, in Oxford in December 2015 and again at RIMS in July 2016. The last two events attracted more than 100 participants. Presentations from these workshops are available online. However, these did not lead to broader understanding of Mochizuki's ideas and the status of his claimed proof was not changed by these events.

In 2017, a number of mathematicians who had examined Mochizuki's argument in detail pointed to a specific point which they could not understand, near the end of the proof of Corollary 3.12, in paper three of four.

In March 2018, Peter Scholze and Jakob Stix visited Kyoto University for five days of discussions with Mochizuki and Yuichiro Hoshi; while this did not resolve the differences, it brought into focus where the difficulties lay. It also resulted in the publication of reports of the discussion by both sides:

- In May 2018, Scholze and Stix wrote a 10-page report, updated in September 2018, detailing the (previously identified) gap in Corollary 3.12 in the proof, describing it as "so severe that in [their] opinion small modifications will not rescue the proof strategy", and that Mochizuki's preprint cannot claim a proof of abc.
- In September 2018, Mochizuki wrote a 41-page summary of his view of the discussions and his conclusions about which aspects of his theory he considers misunderstood. In particular he names:
  - "re-initialization" of (mathematical) objects, making their previous "history" inaccessible;
  - "labels" for different "versions" of objects;
  - the emphasis on the types ("species") of objects.
- In July and October 2018, Mochizuki wrote 8- and 5-page reactions to the May and September versions of the Scholze and Jakob Stix report, maintaining that the gap is the result of their simplifications, and that there is no gap in his theory.

Mochizuki published his work in a series of four journal papers in 2021, in the journal Publications of the Research Institute for Mathematical Sciences, Kyoto University, for which he is editor-in-chief. In a review of these papers in zbMATH, Peter Scholze wrote that his concerns from 2017 and 2018 "have not been addressed in the published version". Other authors have pointed to the unresolved dispute between Mochizuki and Scholze over the correctness of this work as an instance in which the peer review process of mathematical journal publication has failed in its usual function of convincing the mathematical community as a whole of the validity of a result.

== Mathematical significance ==
=== Scope of the theory ===
Inter-universal Teichmüller theory is a continuation of Mochizuki's previous work in arithmetic geometry. This work, which has been peer-reviewed and well received by the mathematical community, includes major contributions to anabelian geometry, and the development of p-adic Teichmüller theory, Hodge–Arakelov theory and Frobenioid categories. It was developed with explicit references to the aim of getting a deeper understanding of abc and related conjectures. In the geometric setting, analogues to certain ideas of IUT appear in the proof by Bogomolov of the geometric Szpiro inequality.

The key prerequisite for IUT is Mochizuki's mono-anabelian geometry and its reconstruction results, which allows one to retrieve various scheme-theoretic objects associated to a hyperbolic curve over a number field from the knowledge of its fundamental group, or of certain Galois groups. IUT applies algorithmic results of mono-anabelian geometry to reconstruct relevant schemes after applying arithmetic deformations to them; a key role is played by three rigidities established in Mochizuki's etale theta theory. Roughly speaking, arithmetic deformations change the multiplication of a given ring, and the task is to measure how much the addition is changed. Infrastructure for deformation procedures is decoded by certain links between so called Hodge theaters, such as a theta-link and a log-link.

These Hodge theaters use two main symmetries of IUT: multiplicative arithmetic and additive geometric. On one hand, Hodge theaters generalize such classical objects in number theory as the adeles and ideles in relation to their global elements. On the other hand, they generalize certain structures appearing in the previous Hodge–Arakelov theory of Mochizuki. The links between theaters are not compatible with ring or scheme structures and are performed outside conventional arithmetic geometry. However, they are compatible with certain group structures, and absolute Galois groups as well as certain types of topological groups play a fundamental role in IUT. Considerations of multiradiality, a generalization of functoriality, imply that three mild indeterminacies have to be introduced.

=== Consequences in number theory ===
The main claimed application of IUT is to various conjectures in number theory, among them the abc conjecture, but also more geometric conjectures such as Szpiro's conjecture on elliptic curves and Vojta's conjecture for curves.

The first step is to translate arithmetic information on these objects to the setting of Frobenioid categories. It is claimed that extra structure on this side allows one to deduce statements which translate back into the claimed results.

One issue with Mochizuki's arguments, which he acknowledges, is that it does not seem possible to get intermediate results in his claimed proof of the abc conjecture using IUT. In other words, there is no smaller subset of his arguments more easily amenable to an analysis by outside experts, which would yield a new result in Diophantine geometries.

Vesselin Dimitrov extracted from Mochizuki's arguments a proof of a quantitative result on abc, which could in principle give a refutation of the proof.
