= Davenport–Schmidt theorem =

How well a certain kind of real number can be approximated by another kind

In mathematics, specifically the area of Diophantine approximation, the Davenport–Schmidt theorem tells us how well a certain kind of real number can be approximated by another kind. Specifically it tells us that we can get a good approximation to irrational numbers that are not quadratic by using either quadratic irrationals or simply rational numbers. It is named after Harold Davenport and Wolfgang M. Schmidt.

== Statement ==
Given a number α which is either rational or a quadratic irrational, we can find unique integers x, y, and z such that x, y, and z are not all zero, the first non-zero one among them is positive, they are relatively prime, and we have

$$x\alpha^2 +y\alpha +z=0.$$

If α is a quadratic irrational we can take x, y, and z to be the coefficients of its minimal polynomial. If α is rational we will have x = 0. With these integers uniquely determined for each such α we can define the height of α to be

$$H(\alpha)=\max\{|x|,|y|,|z|\}.$$

The theorem then says that for any real number ξ which is neither rational nor a quadratic irrational, we can find infinitely many real numbers α which are rational or quadratic irrationals and which satisfy

$$|\xi-\alpha|<CH(\alpha)^{-3}\max(1,\xi^2),$$

where C is any real number satisfying C > 160/9.

While the theorem is related to Roth's theorem, its real use lies in the fact that it is effective, in the sense that the constant C can be worked out for any given ξ.
