= Gisbert Wüstholz =

German mathematician (born 1948)

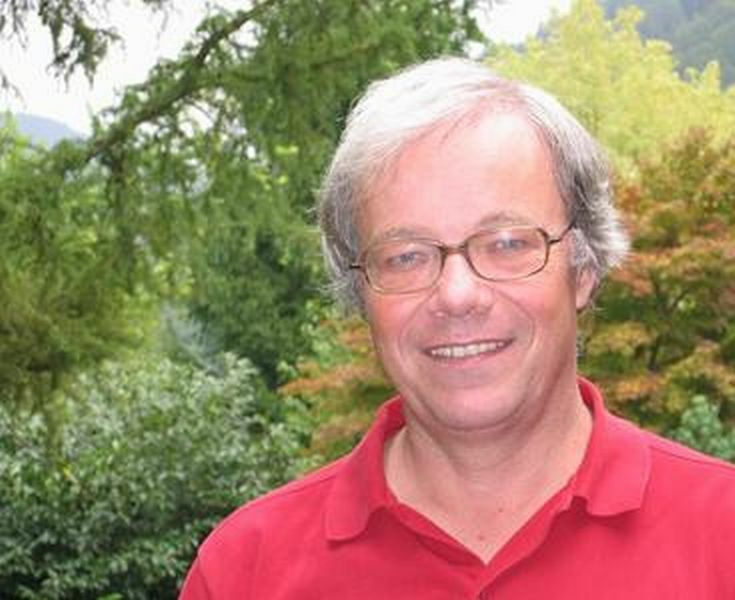
Wüstholz at Oberwolfach, 2005

Gisbert Wüstholz (born 4 June 1948, in Tuttlingen, Germany) is a German mathematician internationally known for his fundamental contributions to number theory (in the field of transcendental number theory, Diophantine approximation) and arithmetic geometry.

== Early life and education ==
Gisbert Wüstholz was born in 1948 in Tuttlingen and studied from 1967 to 1973 at the University of Freiburg where he finished his PhD under the supervision of Theodor Schneider in 1978.

== Career ==
On the invitation of Friedrich Hirzebruch, Wüstholz stayed for a year as a Postdoc at the University of Bonn, and then he got a Postdoc position at the University of Wuppertal, where he worked with Walter Borho from 1979 till 1984, and then moved to Bonn to become associate professor at the newly founded Max Planck Institute for Mathematics. From 1985 to 1987 he was full Professor for Mathematics at Wuppertal, and in 1987 elected for a chair in Mathematics at ETH Zurich. He founded the Zurich Graduate School in Mathematics in 2003, and served as the director since then until 2008. Since 2013 he is a professor emeritus at ETH Zurich.

He is Member of the German National Academy of Sciences Leopoldina (since 2000), of the Berlin-Brandenburg Academy of Sciences and Humanities (since 2003), of the Academia Europaea (since 2008) where he was chairman of the Mathematics Section from 2011 to 2013, and of the European Academy of Sciences and Arts (since 2016). From 1999 he was an Honorary Advisory Professor at the Tongji University, Shanghai. From 2011 he was Senator for Mathematics at the Leopoldina. He is an Honorary Professor at Graz University of Technology, Austria (since 2017).

Wüstholz stayed for extended periods at a number of universities and research institutes, such as the University of Michigan at Ann Arbor (1984,1988) and the Institut des Hautes Études Scientifiques in Bures-sur-Yvette (1987). He was member of the Institute for Advanced Study in Princeton (1986, 1990, 1994/95, 2011), in 1992 he was Visiting Fellow Commoner at Trinity College in Cambridge for research projects with Alan Baker, and visited in the following year the Mathematical Sciences Research Institute in Berkeley (1993). He was frequently a guest at the Max Planck Institute for Mathematics at Bonn, and the Erwin Schrödinger International Institute for Mathematics and Physics (ESI) at Vienna. Since 2015 he is staying as a guest at the University of Zurich. In the academic year 2017/18 he was Senior Research Fellow at the Freiburg Institute for Advanced Studies (FRIAS).

Since 1980 Wüstholz has close connections to a number of universities in Asia: he stayed for a couple of months each at Kyushu University at Fukuoka (1992), the Morningside Center of Mathematics of the Chinese Academy of Sciences at Beijing, at the Hong Kong University of Science and Technology (HKUST) (1996, 1997, 2006, 2010) and at the University of Hong Kong (HKU) (1999, 2011, 2012). Several visits took him to the Vietnam Institute for Advanced Study in Mathematics (VIASM) (2010, 2017), to the Korea Institute for Advanced Study (KIAS) and to the National Taiwan University at Taipei (2009, 2013, 2016).

In 1986 Wüstholz delivered an invited address at the International Congress of Mathematicians (ICM) in Berkeley, in 1992 the Mordell Lecture in Cambridge, in 2001 the 13th Kuwait foundation lecture, an invited lecture at the Leonhard Euler Festival in St. Petersburg in 2007 on the occasion of the celebration of Leonhard Euler’s 300th birthday, and the Academy Lecture at Berlin-Brandenburg Academy of Sciences and Humanities in 2008.

== Research ==
Wüstholz's research interests are Diophantine approximation, Transcendental number theory, and Hodge theory. Highlights of his scientific work are his Analytic subgroup theorem, his proof of the abelian analogue of Lindemann's theorem, his joint work with Gerd Faltings on the Schmidt subspace theorem, his joint work with David Masser on isogeny estimates for abelian varieties, and his joint work with Alan Baker on linear forms in logarithms.

== Selected publications ==
=== Books ===
- Gerd Faltings, Gisbert Wüstholz et al.. Rational Points. Aspects of Mathematics, E6. Friedr. Vieweg & Sohn, Braunschweig (1st ed. 1984, 2nd ed. 1986), 3rd ed., 1992. Papers from the seminar held at the Max-Planck-Institut für Mathematick, Bonn/Wuppertal, 1983/1984, with an appendix by Wüstholz in 3rd ed.
- Wüstholz, Gisbert (2002). A Panorama of Number Theory or the View from Baker's Garden (editor). Cambridge University Press, Cambridge. ISBN 0-521-80799-9. MR 1975726.
- Baker, Alan; Wüstholz, Gisbert (2007). Logarithmic Forms and Diophantine Geometry. New Mathematical Monographs. Vol. 9. Cambridge: Cambridge University Press. ISBN 978-0-521-88268-2. MR 2382891.
- Huber, Annette; Wüstholz, Gisbert (26 May 2022). Transcendence and Linear Relations of 1-Periods. Cambridge: Cambridge University Press. ISBN 978-1-316-51993-6.

=== Articles ===
- Wüstholz, Gisbert (1983), "Über das abelsche Analogon des Lindemannschen Satzes. I" [On the abelian analogue of the Lindemann theorem. I], Inventiones Mathematicae (in German), 72 (3): 363–388, Bibcode:1983InMat..72..363W, doi:10.1007/BF01398393, MR 0704397, S2CID 121954936
- Wüstholz, Gisbert (1987), "Algebraic Groups, Hodge Theory and Transcendence", Proceedings of the International Congress of Mathematicians, Vol. 1, 2 (Berkeley, Calif., 1986), 476–483. Amer. Math. Soc., Providence, RI. MR 0934247.
- Wüstholz, Gisbert (1989), "Multiplicity Estimates on Group Varieties", Annals of Mathematics, Second Series, 129 (3): 471–500, doi:10.2307/1971514, JSTOR 1971514, MR 0997310
- Wüstholz, Gisbert (1989), "Algebraische Punkte auf analytischen Untergruppen algebraischer Gruppen" [Algebraic points on analytic subgroups of algebraic groups], Annals of Mathematics, Second Series (in German), 129 (3): 501–517, doi:10.2307/1971515, JSTOR 1971515, MR 0997311
- Masser, David; Wüstholz, Gisbert (1993), "Periods and minimal abelian subvarieties", Annals of Mathematics, Second Series, 137 (2): 407–458, doi:10.2307/2946542, JSTOR 2946542, MR 1207211
- Masser, David; Wüstholz, Gisbert (1993), "Isogeny estimates for abelian varieties and finiteness theorems", Annals of Mathematics, Second Series, 137 (3): 459–472, doi:10.2307/2946529, JSTOR 2946529, MR 1217345
- Baker, Alan; Wüstholz, Gisbert (1993), "Logarithmic forms and group varieties", J. Reine Angew. Math., 1993 (442): 19–62, doi:10.1515/crll.1993.442.19, MR 1234835, S2CID 118335888
- Faltings, Gerd; Wüstholz, Gisbert (1994), "Diophantine approximations on projective spaces", Inventiones Mathematicae, 116 (1–3): 109–138, Bibcode:1994InMat.116..109F, doi:10.1007/BF01231559, MR 1253191, S2CID 120642283
- Masser, David; Wüstholz, Gisbert (1995), "Factorization estimates for Abelian varieties", Publ. Math. Inst. Hautes Études Sci., 81: 5–24, doi:10.1007/BF02699374, ISSN 0073-8301, MR 1361754, S2CID 73681452
- Cohen, Paula B.; Wüstholz, Gisbert (2002), "Application of the André–Oort Conjecture to some Questions in Transcendence", A Panorama of Number Theory or the View from Baker's Garden, Cambridge University Press, pp. 89–106, doi:10.1017/CBO9780511542961.007, ISBN 978-0-521-80799-9, MR 1975446
- Wüstholz, Gisbert (2012), "Leibniz' conjecture, periods & motives", Colloquium de Giorgi 2009, pp. 33–42, doi:10.1007/978-88-7642-387-1_3, ISBN 978-88-7642-388-8, MR 3184020
