= N conjecture =

Generalization of the abc conjecture to more than three integers

In number theory, the n conjecture is a conjecture stated by Browkin & Brzeziński (1994) as a generalization of the abc conjecture to more than three integers.

== Formulations ==
Given $n \ge 3$, let $a_1,a_2,...,a_n \in \mathbb{Z}$ satisfy three conditions:

(i) $\gcd(a_1,a_2,...,a_n)=1$
(ii) $a_1 + a_2 + ... + a_n = 0$
(iii) no proper subsum of $a_1,a_2,...,a_n$ equals $0$

First formulation

The n conjecture states that for every $\varepsilon>0$, there is a constant $C$ depending on $n$ and $\varepsilon$, such that:

$\operatorname{max}(|a_1|,|a_2|,...,|a_n|)< C_{n,\varepsilon}\operatorname{rad}(|a_1| \cdot |a_2| \cdot \ldots \cdot |a_n|)^{2n - 5 + \varepsilon}$

where $\operatorname{rad}(m)$ denotes the radical of an integer $m$, defined as the product of the distinct prime factors of $m$.

Second formulation

Define the quality of $a_1,a_2,...,a_n$ as

$$q(a_1,a_2,...,a_n) = \frac{\log(\operatorname{max}(|a_1|,|a_2|,...,|a_n|))}{\log(\operatorname{rad}(|a_1| \cdot |a_2| \cdot ... \cdot |a_n|))}$$

The n conjecture states that $\limsup q(a_1,a_2,...,a_n)= 2n-5$.

== Stronger form ==
A variant called strong n conjecture or Ramaekers conjecture was proposed by Ramaekers (2009). This variant of the conjecture provides a sharper quality estimate for n-tuples by replacing the assumption of setwise coprimeness of $a_1,a_2,...,a_n$ with pairwise coprimeness of $a_1,a_2,...,a_n$. There are two formulations of the conjecture:

Given $n \ge 3$, let $a_1,a_2,...,a_n \in \mathbb{Z}$ satisfy three conditions:

(i) $a_1,a_2,...,a_n$ are pairwise coprime
(ii) $a_1 + a_2 + ... + a_n = 0$
(iii) no proper subsum of $a_1,a_2,...,a_n$ equals $0$

First formulation

The strong n conjecture states that for every $\varepsilon>0$, there is a constant $C$ depending on $n$ and $\varepsilon$, such that:

$\operatorname{max}(|a_1|,|a_2|,...,|a_n|)< C_{n,\varepsilon}\operatorname{rad}(|a_1| \cdot |a_2| \cdot \ldots \cdot |a_n|)^{1 + \varepsilon}$

Second formulation

Define the quality of $a_1,a_2,...,a_n$ as

$$q(a_1,a_2,...,a_n) = \frac{\log(\operatorname{max}(|a_1|,|a_2|,...,|a_n|))}{\log(\operatorname{rad}(|a_1| \cdot |a_2| \cdot ... \cdot |a_n|))}$$

The strong n conjecture states that:

$$\limsup q(a_1,a_2,...,a_n) = 1$$.

Hölzl, Kleine & Stephan (2025) have shown that for $n \geq 5$ the above limit superior is for odd $n$ at least $5/3$ and for even $n$ is at least $5/4$. For the cases $n=3$ (abc-conjecture) and $n=4$, they did not find any nontrivial lower bounds. It is also open whether there is a common constant upper bound above the limit superiors for all $n \geq 3$. For the exact status of the case $n=3$ see the article on the abc conjecture.
