= Habegger =

Habegger may be a reference to:

== People ==
- Jorge Habegger (b.1946), a football coach from Argentina
- Les Habegger (1924–2017), a basketball coach and manager from the United States
- Philipp Habegger (b.1978), a mathematician from Switzerland

== Organisations ==
- Habegger Maschinenfabrik AG, a former engineering company based in Thun, Switzerland
