= Analytic subgroup theorem =

Term used in transcendental number theory

In mathematics, the analytic subgroup theorem is a significant result in modern transcendental number theory. It may be seen as a generalisation of Baker's theorem on linear forms in logarithms. Gisbert Wüstholz proved it in the 1980s. It marked a breakthrough in the theory of transcendental numbers. Many longstanding open problems can be deduced as direct consequences.

== Statement ==
If $G$ is a commutative algebraic group defined over an algebraic number field and $A$ is a Lie subgroup of $G$ with Lie algebra defined over the number field then $A$ does not contain any non-zero algebraic point of $G$ unless $A$ contains a proper algebraic subgroup.

One of the central new ingredients of the proof was the theory of multiplicity estimates of group varieties developed by David Masser and Gisbert Wüstholz in special cases and established by Wüstholz in the general case which was necessary for the proof of the analytic subgroup theorem.

== Consequences ==
One of the spectacular consequences of the analytic subgroup theorem was the Isogeny Theorem published by Masser and Wüstholz. A direct consequence is the Tate conjecture for abelian varieties which Gerd Faltings had proved with totally different methods which has many applications in modern arithmetic geometry.

Using the multiplicity estimates for group varieties Wüstholz succeeded to get the final expected form for lower bound for linear forms in logarithms. This was put into an effective form in a joint work of him with Alan Baker which marks the current state of art. Besides the multiplicity estimates a further new ingredient was a very sophisticated use of geometry of numbers to obtain very sharp lower bounds.

== See also ==
- Algebraic curve
