= Masser =

Masser is a surname. Notable people with the surname include:

- David Masser (born 1948), British Swiss mathematician
- Michael Masser (1941–2015), American songwriter, composer, and producer

== See also ==
- Maaser Sheni, a Mitzvah instructing the Second Tithe be brought to Jerusalem
