= Thue equation =

Type of equation with integer coefficients

In mathematics, a Thue equation is a Diophantine equation of the form

$$f(x,y) = r,$$

where $f$ is an irreducible bivariate homogeneous polynomial of degree at least 3 over the rational numbers, and $r$ is a nonzero rational number. It is named after Axel Thue, who in 1909 proved that a Thue equation can have only finitely many solutions in integers $x$ and $y$, a result known as Thue's theorem.

The Thue equation is solvable effectively: there is an explicit bound on the solutions $x$, $y$ of the form $(C_1 r)^{C_2}$ where constants $C_1$ and $C_2$ depend only on the form $f$. A stronger result holds: if $K$ is the field generated by the roots of $f$, then the equation has only finitely many solutions with $x$ and $y$ integers of $K$, and again these may be effectively determined.

== Finiteness of solutions and diophantine approximation ==
Thue's original proof that the equation named in his honour has finitely many solutions is through the proof of what is now known as Thue's theorem: it asserts that for any algebraic number $\alpha$ having degree $d \geq 3$ and for any $\varepsilon > 0$ there exists only finitely many coprime integers $p, q$ with $q > 0$ such that $|\alpha - p/q| < q^{-(d+1+\varepsilon)/2}$. Applying this theorem allows one to almost immediately deduce the finiteness of solutions. However, Thue's proof, as well as subsequent improvements by Siegel, Dyson, and Roth were all ineffective.

== Solution algorithm ==
Finding all solutions to a Thue equation can be achieved by a practical algorithm, which has been implemented in the following computer algebra systems:

- in PARI/GP as functions thueinit() and thue().
- in Magma as functions ThueObject() and ThueSolve().
- in Mathematica through Reduce[]
- in Maple through ThueSolve()

== Bounding the number of solutions ==
While there are several effective methods to solve Thue equations (including using Baker's method and Skolem's p-adic method), these are not able to give the best theoretical bounds on the number of solutions. One may qualify an effective bound $C(f,r)$ of the Thue equation $f(x,y) = r$ by the parameters it depends on, and how "good" the dependence is.

The best result known today, essentially building on pioneering work of Bombieri and Schmidt, gives a bound of the shape $C(f,r) = C \cdot (\deg f)^{1 + \omega(r)}$, where $C$ is an absolute constant (that is, independent of both $f$ and $r$) and $\omega(\cdot)$ is the number of distinct prime factors of $r$. The most significant qualitative improvement to the theorem of Bombieri and Schmidt is due to Stewart, who obtained a bound of the form $C(f,r) = C \cdot (\deg f)^{1 + \omega(g)}$ where $g$ is a divisor of $r$ exceeding $|r|^{3/4}$ in absolute value. It is conjectured that one may take the bound $C(f,r) = C(\deg f)$; that is, depending only on the degree of $f$ but not its coefficients, and completely independent of the integer $r$ on the right hand side of the equation.

This is a weaker form of a conjecture of Stewart, and is a special case of the uniform boundedness conjecture for rational points. This conjecture has been proven for "small" integers $r$, where smallness is measured in terms of the discriminant of the form $f$, by various authors, including Evertse, Stewart, and Akhtari. Stewart and Xiao demonstrated a strong form of this conjecture, asserting that the number of solutions is absolutely bounded, holds on average (as $r$ ranges over the interval $|r| \leq Z$ with $Z \rightarrow \infty$).

== See also ==
- Roth's theorem
- Faltings' theorem
