= Michael Eastwood =

Australian mathematician

- Scientific career
- Fields: Differential Geometry
- Doctoral advisor: Robert C. Gunning
- Doctoral students: A. Rod Gover

Michael G. Eastwood FAA is a mathematician at the University of Adelaide, known for his work in twistor theory, conformal differential geometry and invariant differential operators. In 1976 he received a PhD at Princeton University in several complex variables under Robert C. Gunning. He was a member of the twistor research group of Roger Penrose at the University of Oxford and he coauthored the monograph The Penrose Transform: Its Interaction with Representation Theory with Robert Baston. After moving to South Australia in 1985 he was the 1992 recipient of the Australian Mathematical Society Medal and made a Fellow of the Australian Academy of Science in 2005. In 2012 he was named to the inaugural (2013) class of fellows of the American Mathematical Society.
