= Cameron Leigh Stewart =

Canadian mathematician

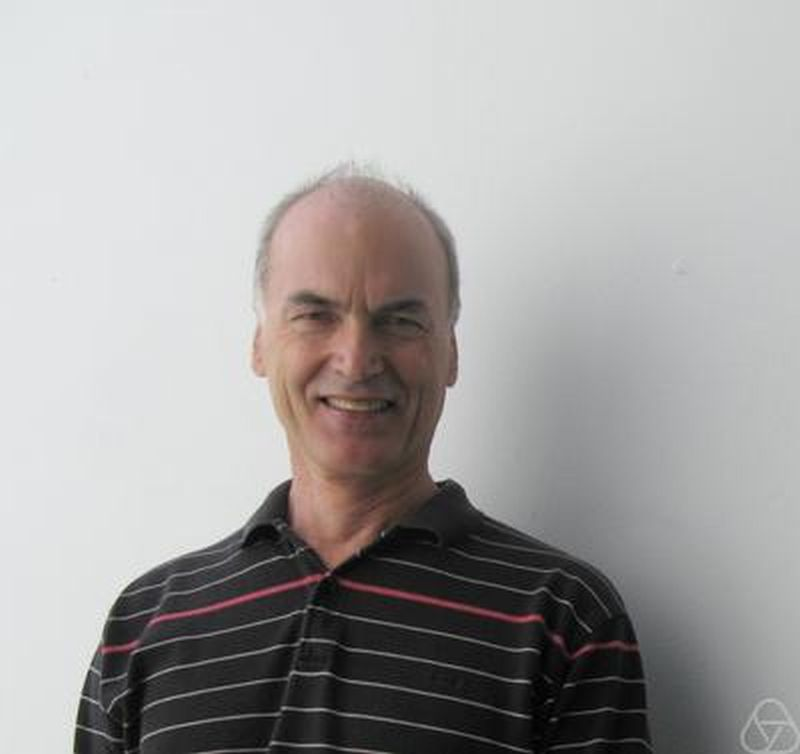
- Education: University of Cambridge; McGill University; University of British Columbia
- Awards: J. T. Knight Prize (1974); Fellow of the Royal Society of Canada (1989); Fields Institute Fellow (2008)
- Scientific career
- Fields: Mathematics
- Workplaces: University of Waterloo
- Doctoral advisor: Alan Baker

Cameron Leigh Stewart FRSC is a Canadian mathematician. He is a professor of pure mathematics at the University of Waterloo.

== Contributions ==
He has made numerous contributions to number theory, in particular to work on the abc conjecture. In 1976 he obtained, with Alan Baker, an effective improvement to Liouville's Theorem. In 1991 he proved that the number of solutions to a Thue equation $f(x,y) = h$ is at most $2800(1 + 1/4\epsilon \deg f)(\deg f)^{1 + \omega(g)}$, where $\epsilon$ is a pre-determined positive real number and $\omega(g)$ is the number of distinct primes dividing a large divisor $g$ of $h$. This improves on an earlier result of Enrico Bombieri and Wolfgang M. Schmidt and is close to the best possible result. In 1995 he obtained, along with Jaap Top, the existence of infinitely many quadratic, cubic, and sextic twists of elliptic curves of large rank. In 1991 and 2001 respectively, he obtained, along with Kunrui Yu, the best unconditional estimates for the abc conjecture. In 2013, he solved an old problem of Erdős involving Lucas and Lehmer numbers. In particular, he proved that the largest prime divisor $P(n)$ of $2^n - 1$ satisfies $\lim_{n \rightarrow \infty} P(n)/n = \infty$.

== Education ==
Stewart completed a B.Sc. at the University of British Columbia in 1971 and a M.Sc in 1972 from McGill University. He earned his doctorate from the University of Cambridge in 1976, under the supervision of Alan Baker.

== Recognition ==
In 1974, while at Cambridge, he was awarded the J.T. Knight Prize.

He was elected Fellow of the Royal Society of Canada in 1989. He was appointed Fellow of the Fields Institute in 2008. Since 2003 he has held a Canada Research Chair (tier 1). Since 2005 he has been appointed University Professor at the University of Waterloo. He was selected to give the annual Isidore and Hilda Dressler Lecture at Kansas State University in 2015.

He was elected as a fellow of the Canadian Mathematical Society in 2019.

== Selected works ==
- Stewart, C. L.; Tijdeman, R. (1986). "On the Oesterlé-Masser conjecture". Monatshefte für Mathematik. 102 (3): 251–257. doi:10.1007/BF01294603. S2CID 123621917.
- Erdős, P.; Stewart, C. L.; Tijdeman, R. (1988). "Some diophantine equations with many solutions". Compositio Mathematica. 66 (1): 37–56.
- Stewart, C.L. (1991). "On the number of solutions of polynomial congruences and Thue equations". J. Amer. Math. Soc. 4 (4): 793–835. doi:10.1090/s0894-0347-1991-1119199-x. MR 1119199.
- Stewart, C. L.; Kunrui Yu (1991). "On the abc conjecture". Mathematische Annalen. 291 (1): 225–230. doi:10.1007/BF01445201. S2CID 123894587.
- Stewart, C. L.; Top, J. (1995). "On ranks of twists of elliptic curves and power-free values of binary forms". J. Amer. Math. Soc. 8 (4): 943–973. doi:10.1090/s0894-0347-1995-1290234-5. MR 1290234.
- Stewart, C. L.; Kunrui Yu (2001). "On the abc conjecture, II". Duke Math. J. 108 (1): 169–181. doi:10.1215/s0012-7094-01-10815-6. MR 1831823. S2CID 14862375.
- Stewart, C. L. (2013). "On divisors of Lucas and Lehmer numbers". Acta Math. 211 (2): 291–314. arXiv:1008.1274. doi:10.1007/s11511-013-0105-y. MR 3143892. S2CID 119666101.
- Stewart, C. L.; Xiao, Stanley Yao (2019). "On the representation of integers by binary forms". Mathematische Annalen. 375: 133–163. arXiv:1605.03427. doi:10.1007/s00208-019-01855-y.
