= Indigenous bundle =

Type of fiber bundle on a Riemann surface

In mathematics, an indigenous bundle on a Riemann surface is a fiber bundle with a flat connection associated to some complex projective structure. Indigenous bundles were introduced by Robert C. Gunning (1967). Indigenous bundles for curves over p-adic fields were introduced by Shinichi Mochizuki (1996) in his study of p-adic Teichmüller theory.
