= Radical of an integer =

Product of the prime factors of an integer

The first thousand values of rad(n). rad(n) = n when n is square-free.

In number theory, the radical of a positive integer n is defined as the product of the distinct prime numbers dividing n. Each prime factor of n occurs exactly once as a factor of this product:

$$\displaystyle\mathrm{rad}(n)=\prod_{\scriptstyle p\mid n\atop p\text{ prime}}p$$

The radical plays a central role in the statement of the abc conjecture.

== Examples ==
Radical numbers for the first few positive integers are

1, 2, 3, 2, 5, 6, 7, 2, 3, 10, 11, 6, 13, 14, 15, 2, 17, 6, 19, 10, 21, 22, 23, 6, 5, 26, 3, 14, 29, 30, 31, 2, 33, 34, 35, 6, 37, 38, 39, 10, 41, 42, 43, 22, 15, 46, 47, 6, 7, 10, ... (sequence A007947 in the OEIS).

For example,
$$504 = 2^3 \cdot 3^2 \cdot 7$$

and therefore
$$\operatorname{rad}(504) = 2 \cdot 3 \cdot 7 = 42$$

== Properties ==
The function $\mathrm{rad}$ is multiplicative (but not completely multiplicative).

The radical of any integer $n$ is the largest square-free divisor of $n$ and so also described as the square-free kernel of $n$. There is no known polynomial-time algorithm for computing the square-free part of an integer.

The definition is generalized to the largest $t$-free divisor of $n$, $\mathrm{rad}_t$, which are multiplicative functions which act on prime powers as

$$\mathrm{rad}_t(p^e) = p^{\mathrm{min}(e, t - 1)}$$

The cases $t=3$ and $t=4$ are tabulated in OEIS: A007948 and OEIS: A058035.

The notion of the radical occurs in the abc conjecture, which states that, for any $\varepsilon > 0$, there exists a finite $K_\varepsilon$ such that, for all triples of coprime positive integers $a$, $b$, and $c$ satisfying $a+b=c$,

$$c < K_\varepsilon\, \operatorname{rad}(abc)^{1 + \varepsilon}$$

For any integer $n$, the nilpotent elements of the finite ring $\mathbb{Z}/n\mathbb{Z}$ are all of the multiples of $\operatorname{rad}(n)$.

The Dirichlet series is

$$\prod_p \left(1+\frac{p^{1-s}}{1-p^{-s}}\right) = \sum_{n=1}^{\infty} \frac{\operatorname{rad}(n)}{n^s}$$

== Notation and name ==
The notation for the function was likely introduced by Joseph Oesterlé, in the same paper where the abc conjecture was published. The name is related to the radical of an ideal, as radical of $I = \langle p_1^{\alpha_1}\cdots p_k^{\alpha_k}\rangle$ in the ring $\mathbb Z$ of integers is precisely $\sqrt{I} = \langle p_1\cdots p_k\rangle$.
