= Robert C. Gunning =

American mathematician

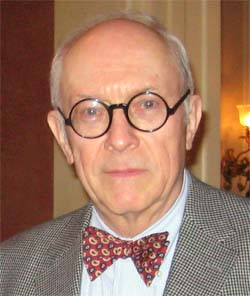
- Robert Gunning in 2008
- Born: November 27, 1931 (age 94); Longmont, Colorado, U.S.
- Education: University of Colorado; Princeton University
- Occupation: Mathematician
- Scientific career
- Fields: Complex analysis
- Workplaces: Princeton University
- Doctoral students: Richard S. Hamilton, Yum-Tong Siu

Robert Clifford Gunning (born 27 November 1931) is an American mathematician. He is a professor of mathematics at Princeton University, specializing in complex analysis, who introduced indigenous bundles.

== Education and career ==
Gunning was born in Longmont, Colorado, and attended to high school in his hometown. In 1947 he was admitted into the University of Colorado, graduating with a bachelor's degree in 1952. For his graduate studies he went to Princeton University, where he earned his Ph.D. in 1955 under Salomon Bochner with thesis A classification of factors of automorphy. He then taught at the University of Chicago and in 1956 as Higgins-Lecturer at Princeton University. At Princeton, Gunning became in 1957 assistant professor, in 1962 associate professor, and in 1966 professor. He was a visiting professor in São Paulo in 1958, Cambridge in 1959/60, Munich in 1967, Oxford in 1968, Boulder in 1970, and Los Angeles in 1972.

Gunning is known as the author of important books on functions of several complex variables.

From 1958 to 1961 he was a Sloan Research Fellow. He served as Princeton University's dean of the faculty from 1989 to 1995. In 2003 he received Princeton University's prize for outstanding teaching. For a number of years he was an editor for Princeton University Press and for the Annals of Mathematics Studies. He was also the editor of the collected works of Salomon Bochner. In 1970 he was an invited speaker at the International Mathematical Congress in Nice (Some multivariable problems arising from Riemann surfaces).

Among his doctoral students are Sheldon Katz, Henry Laufer, Richard S. Hamilton, Yum-Tong Siu, and Michael Eastwood.

In 2012 he became a fellow of the American Mathematical Society.

== Selected works ==
- Analytic functions of several complex variables. Prentice-Hall 1965.
- Lectures on Riemann Surfaces. Princeton University Press 1966.
- Lectures on Vector Bundles over Riemann Surfaces. Princeton University Press 1967.
- Riemann Surfaces and generalized Theta Functions. Springer, Ergebnisse der Mathematik und ihrer Grenzgebiete, 1976.
- On uniformization of complex manifolds: The role of connections, Princeton University Press 1978
- Introduction to holomorphic functions of several variables. 3 vols., Wadsworth and Brooks/Cole, 1990.
- An Introduction to Analysis, Princeton University Press, 2018.
