= Paula Tretkoff =

Australian-American mathematician

Paula Tretkoff (née Sarah Paula Beazley Cohen) is a retired Australian-American mathematician who studies number theory, noncommutative geometry, and hypergeometric functions. She is a professor emerita of mathematics at Texas A&M University, and a retired director of research at the Centre national de la recherche scientifique (CNRS) associated with the University of Lille.

== Education and career ==
Tretkoff was born in Sydney, Australia, but is a US citizen. She studied mathematics at the University of Sydney, earning first class honours in applied mathematics in 1978 and in pure mathematics in 1979. She completed her Ph.D. in 1985 at the University of Nottingham, in England. Her dissertation, Height Problems and Modular Forms, was supervised by David Masser. She completed a habilitation in 1995 at Pierre and Marie Curie University.

Tretkoff joined CNRS as a researcher in 1983, associated with Pierre and Marie Curie University. She moved to Lille, and became a director of research, in 1995. In 2002 she took up a position as a professor at Texas A&M. Although retired, she remains affiliated with CNRS as Directeur de Recherche and with Texas A&M as Professor Emerita.

== Books ==
Tretkoff is the author of two books:

- Complex Ball Quotients and Line Arrangements in the Projective Plane, Mathematical Notes, vol. 51, Princeton University Press, 2016, ISBN 978-0-691-14477-1
- Periods and Special Functions in Transcendence, Advanced Textbooks in Mathematics, World Scientific Publishing, 2017, ISBN 978-1-78634-294-2
