= Henry Laufer =

American mathematician and businessman

Henry B. Laufer
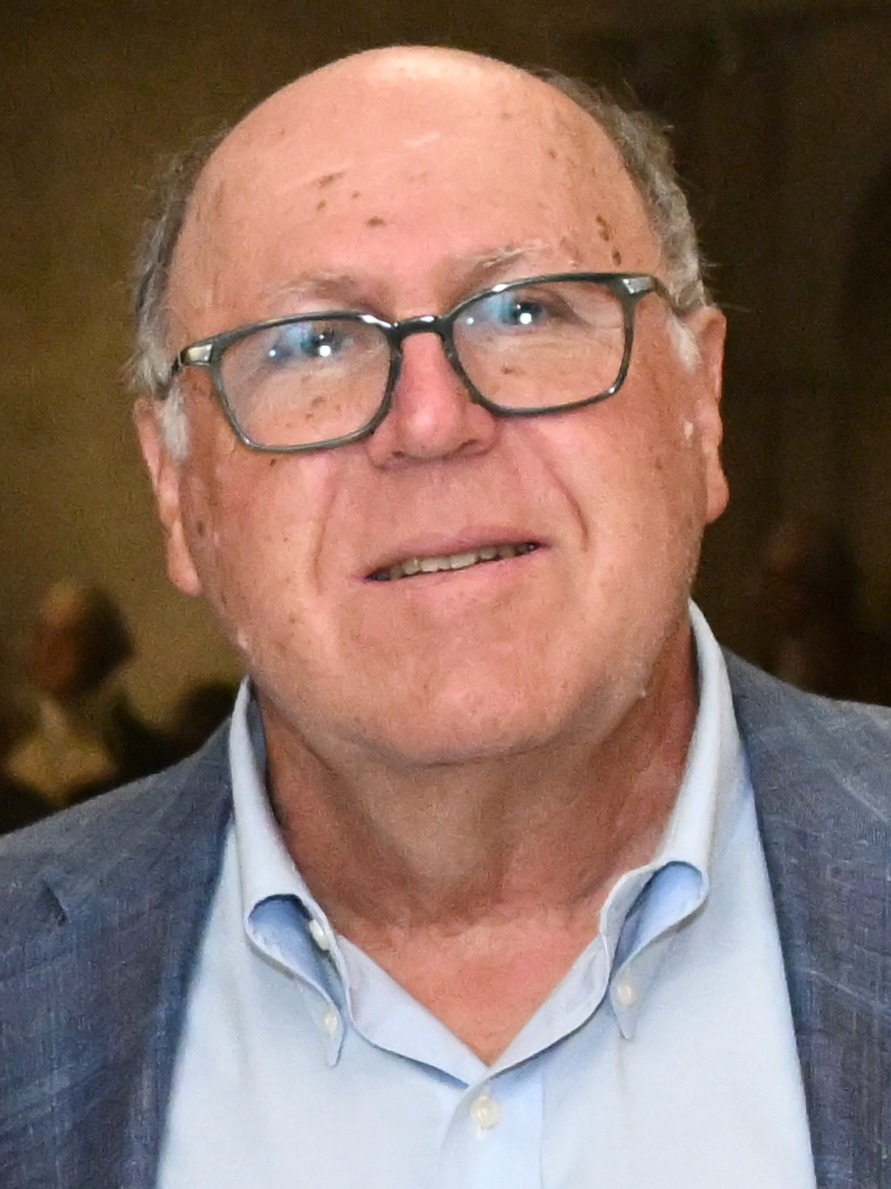
- Laufer in 2024
- Born: 13 August 1945 (age 81)
- Education: Princeton University (PhD)
- Occupations: Hedge fund manager, investor, mathematician, philanthropist
- Title: Retired Vice President & Chief Scientist (Renaissance Technologies)
- Spouse: Marsha Zlatin Laufer
- Children: 3
- Scientific career
- Thesis: Sheaf Cohomology and Envelopes of Holomorphy (1965)
- Doctoral advisor: Robert Clifford Gunning
- Doctoral students: Stephen Shing-Toung Yau

Henry B. Laufer (born 1945) is an American hedge fund manager, investor, mathematician, and philanthropist. He served as the Vice President of Research at Renaissance Technologies.

== Early life ==
Henry B. Laufer was born to a Jewish family in 1945. He received his PhD from Princeton University in 1965, studying with Robert Gunning.

== Career ==
Laufer joined the mathematics department at the State University of New York at Stony Brook as a faculty member in 1971. His research focused on complex variables and algebraic topology. He left Stony Brook in 1992 to join Renaissance Technologies. In 2015, a conference was held for his 70th anniversary at Tsinghua University in China.

Laufer co-founded the Medallion Fund with Jim Simons in 1988. Laufer served as chief scientist and vice president of research at Renaissance Technologies, its parent company. He now serves on its board of directors.

Laufer earned US$125,000,000 in 2008, during the 2008 financial crisis. The following year, in 2009, he was named one of "Wall Street's Highest Earners" by Forbes, with an income of US$390,000,000.

== Philanthropy and political contributions ==
Laufer and his wife enabled the foundation of the Louis and Beatrice Laufer Center for Physical and Quantitative Biology at Stony Brook University with a donation in 2008. The couple joined Jim and Marilyn Simons to endow the Mathematical Sciences Research Institute at the University of California, Berkeley, with an unrestricted $70 million gift in 2022. The school honored the donors by renaming the Institute to the Simons Laufer Mathematical Sciences Institute.

Laufer donated US$500,000 to Correct the Record, a political action committee that supported Hillary Clinton's 2016 presidential campaign, in February 2016. Meanwhile, in April 2016, Laufer and his wife organized a US$500-ticket fundraiser for Clinton in Florida. The couple also gave around $950,000 to Joe Biden's 2020 presidential campaign.

== Personal life ==
Laufer is married to Dr. Marsha Zlatin Laufer, a speech-language pathologist, philanthropist and political activist. She served as the chairwoman of the Democratic Party for the town of Brookhaven, New York from 2001 to 2009. The couple resides in Manalapan, Florida. They have 3 children.

As of 2023, Laufer's net worth was estimated at $2.6 billion by Forbes.

== Selected bibliography ==
- Laufer, Henry B. (1971), Normal two-dimensional singularities, Annals of Mathematics Studies, 71, Princeton University Press
- Laufer, Henry B. (1977), "On minimally elliptic singularities", American Journal of Mathematics, 99 (6): 1257–1295, doi:10.2307/2374025, ISSN 0002-9327, JSTOR 2374025
- Laufer, Henry B. (1972), "On rational singularities", American Journal of Mathematics, 94 (2): 597–608, doi:10.2307/2374639, ISSN 0002-9327, JSTOR 2374639
