= Yuval Flicker =

American mathematician

- Born: 3 January 1955 (age 71); Kfar Saba, Israel
- Education: University of Cambridge; Hebrew University of Jerusalem; Tel Aviv University
- Awards: Alexander von Humboldt Fellow, Fulbright Award, Lady Davis Fellow, Simons Foundation Fellow, NUS Senior Fellow
- Scientific career
- Fields: Mathematics
- Workplaces: Ohio State University; Ariel University
- Doctoral advisor: Alan Baker

Yuval Zvi Flicker (Hebrew: יוּבַל צְבִי פְלִיקֶר; born 1955 in Israel) is an American mathematician. His primary research interests include automorphic representations.

He received his PhD degree from the University of Cambridge in 1978. His thesis advisor was Alan Baker, in the area of transcendental number theory.

He taught at Princeton University, Columbia University, Harvard University and Ohio State University, where he now has the title of Faculty Emeritus. He also worked with David Kazhdan and Pierre Deligne.

== Education ==
Born 1955 in Kfar-Saba, raised in Ramat-Gan, Flicker studied Mathematics and Philosophy at Tel-Aviv University gaining a BA in 1973, then he studied Mathematics at the Hebrew University gaining an MA in 1974. After that he studied Part III of the Mathematical Tripos at DPMMS, Cambridge University in 1974-75, where he was awarded his PhD under the supervision of Fields Medalist Alan Baker in 1978. His dissertation was "Linear forms on Abelian Varieties over Local Fields". He was a Post Doctoral scholar at the Institute for Advanced Study Princeton 1978-79, at Columbia University 1979-81, at Princeton University 1981-85, and at Harvard University 1985-87. He worked as a member of the Mathematics Department at the Ohio State University from 1987 to 2015.

== Research ==
Flicker's research interests include Automorphic and Admissible Representations, Automorphic forms over function fields, Arithmetic Geometry, Lifting of Representations, Hecke-Iwahori algebras, p-adic automorphic forms, Galois Cohomology, Local-Global Principles, Motives, Algebraic Groups, Covering Groups, Shimura Varieties. He coauthored works with David Kazhdan, Pierre Deligne, his students and other scholars. He acknowledges influence of Joseph Bernstein and of Vladimir Drinfeld. He is the author of several books.

Yuval Flicker 1973

== Dissemination ==
Flicker visited and lectured at the Universities of Mannheim, Bielefeld, Münster, Essen, Köln, HU Berlin supported by a Humboldt Stiftung, DAAD and SFB; at MPIM in Bonn; at University of Tokyo; at TIFR Bombay (and later TIFR Mumbai); at University of Santiago, Chile; at University of Buenos Aires supported by a Fulbright award; at the Chinese Academy of Sciences; at National University of Singapore supported by an NUS Senior Fellowship; at the Hebrew University of Jerusalem supported by a Lady Davis Fellowship and Schonbrunn Professorship, and Simons Fellowship; at IMPA Rio de Janeiro; at Erzincan University supported by TÜBİTAK.

Flicker endorsed An Open Letter to Richard Riley, United States Secretary of Education.

== Books ==
Yuval Flicker is the author of a number of books including:

- Arthur's Invariant Trace Formula and Comparison of Inner Forms (2016)
- Drinfeld Moduli Schemes and Automorphic Forms (2013)
- Automorphic Representations of Low Rank Groups (2006)
- Automorphic Forms and Shimura Varieties of PGSp(2) (2005)
- Matching of Orbital Integrals on GL(4) and GSp(2) (1999)
