= P-adic Teichmüller theory =

Mathematics theory

In mathematics, p-adic Teichmüller theory describes the "uniformization" of p-adic curves and their moduli, generalizing the usual Teichmüller theory that describes the uniformization of Riemann surfaces and their moduli. It was introduced and developed by Shinichi Mochizuki (1996, 1999).

The first problem is to reformulate the Fuchsian uniformization of a complex Riemann surface (an isomorphism from the upper half plane to a universal covering space of the surface) in a way that makes sense for p-adic curves. The existence of a Fuchsian uniformization is equivalent to the existence of a canonical indigenous bundle over the Riemann surface: the unique indigenous bundle that is invariant under complex conjugation and whose monodromy representation is quasi-Fuchsian. For p-adic curves, the analogue of complex conjugation is the Frobenius endomorphism, and the analogue of the quasi-Fuchsian condition is an integrality condition on the indigenous line bundle. So in p-adic Teichmüller theory, the p-adic analogue the Fuchsian uniformization of Teichmüller theory, is the study of integral Frobenius invariant indigenous bundles.

== See also ==
- Anabelian geometry
- Inter-universal Teichmüller theory
- Nilcurve
