= Jerzy Browkin =

Polish mathematician (1934–2015)

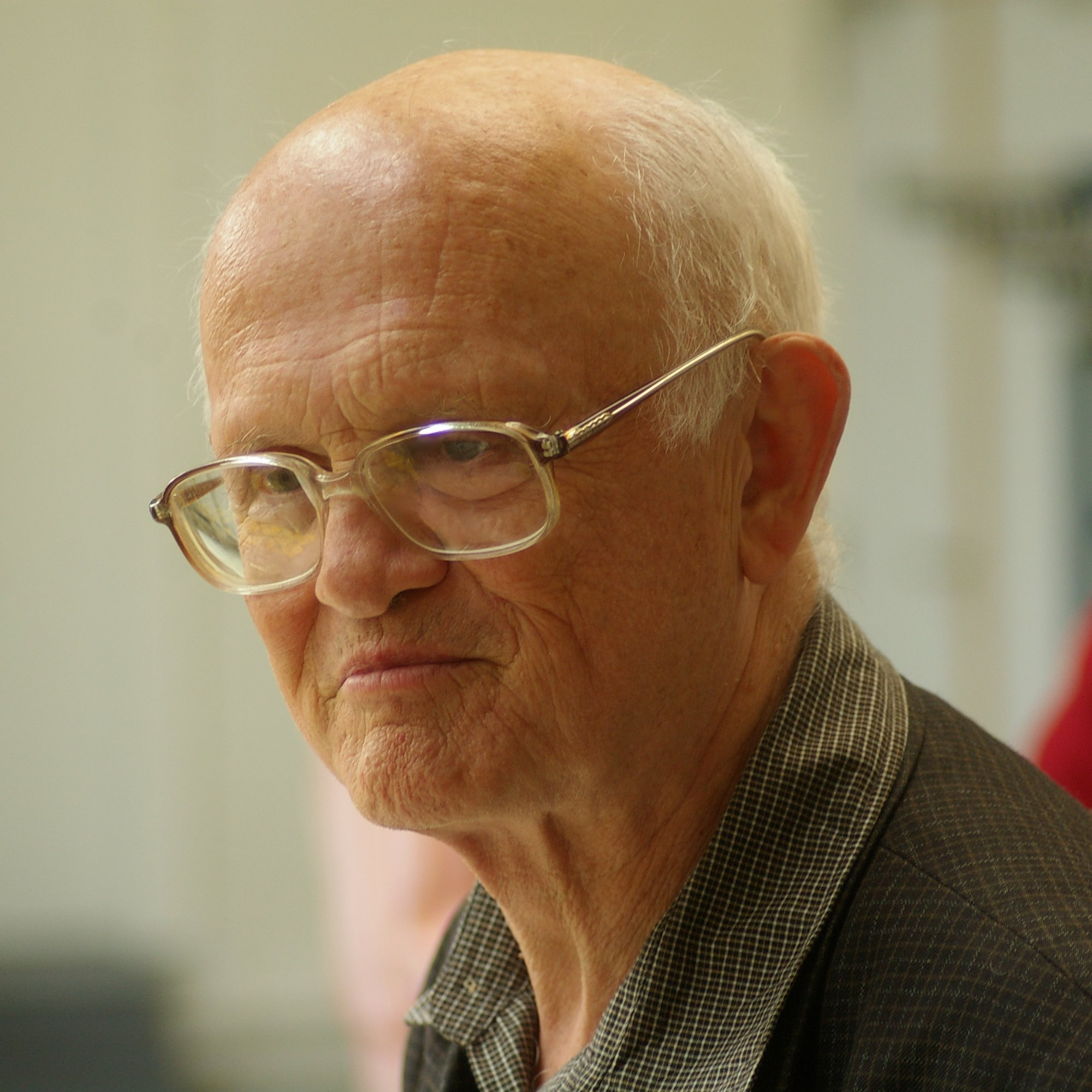
- Jerzy Browkin
- Born: 5 November 1934
- Died: 23 November 2015 (aged 81); Warsaw, Poland
- Education: University of Warsaw
- Scientific career
- Fields: Mathematics, Number Theory

Jerzy Browkin (5 November 1934 – 23 November 2015) was a Polish mathematician, studying mainly algebraic number theory. He was a professor at the Institute of Mathematics of the Polish Academy of Sciences. In 1994, together with Juliusz Brzeziński, he formulated the n-conjecture—a version of the abc conjecture involving n > 2 integers.
