= A. Rod Gover =

New Zealand mathematician

Rod Gover
- Born: Ashwin Rod Gover
- Known for: Invariant theory problems, operator classification problem
- Scientific career
- Fields: Mathematics, differential geometry, theoretical physics
- Thesis: A Geometrical Construction of Conformally Invariant Differential Operators (1989)
- Doctoral advisor: Michael Eastwood; Lane P. Hughston

Ashwin Rod Gover is a New Zealand mathematician and a Fellow of the Royal Society of New Zealand. He is currently employed as a Professor of Pure Mathematics at the University of Auckland in New Zealand. In 2026 he was awarded the Hector Medal by the Royal Society Te Apārangi.

== Education and career ==
Gover received his secondary education at Tauranga Boys' College, where he was Head Boy and Dux. He earned a Bachelor of Science with Honours and Master of Science in physics at Canterbury University and a Doctor of Philosophy (DPhil) in Mathematics in 1989 at Oxford. He joined the University of Auckland as a lecturer in 1999, before being promoted to Senior Lecturer in 2001, Associate Professor in 2005, and Professor in 2008. He is an elected Fellow of the New Zealand Mathematical Society.

In October 2026 Gover was awarded the Hector Medal by the Royal Society Te Apārangi, for "outstanding work which has advanced the chemical, physical, mathematical, or information sciences". The citation noted his contributions to conformal geometry, including the co-invention of "tractor calculus", as well as his mentorship of young mathematicians and his role in the New Zealand Mathematics Research Institute.

== Research areas ==
His current main research areas are

- Differential geometry and its relationship to representation theory
- Applications to analysis on manifolds, PDE theory and Mathematical Physics
- Conformal, CR and related structures

He has published work on a range of topics including integral transforms and their applications to representation theory and quantum groups. His main area of specialisation is the class of parabolic differential geometries. Tractor calculus is important for treating geometries in this class, and a current theme of his work is the further development of this calculus, its relationship to other geometric constructions and tools, as well as its applications to the construction and understanding of local and global geometric invariants and natural differential equations.
