= Philipp Habegger =

Swiss mathematician

- Born: July 23, 1978 (age 48)
- Education: University of Basel
- Scientific career
- Fields: Mathematics
- Workplaces: University of Basel; University of Zurich; ETH Zurich
- Thesis: Heights and Multiplicative Relations on Algebraic Varieties (2007)
- Doctoral advisor: David Masser

Philipp Habegger (born 23 July 1978) is a Swiss mathematician and a professor of mathematics at the University of Basel who works in Diophantine geometry.

== Early life and education ==
Habegger was born on 23 July 1978. He received his Ph.D. under the supervision of David Masser at the University of Basel in 2007.

== Career ==
From 2008 to 2010, Habegger was a ETH Fellow at ETH Zurich. He moved to the University of Zurich for a lectureship position in 2010. In 2013, he was a von Neumann Fellow at the Institute for Advanced Study. As of 2021, Habegger is a professor of mathematics at the University of Basel.

== Research ==
Habegger's research focuses on height functions and their applications to unlikely intersections.

== Selected publications ==
- Gao, Ziyang; Habegger, Philipp (2019). "Heights in families of abelian varieties and the Geometric Bogomolov Conjecture". Annals of Mathematics. 189 (2): 527. arXiv:1801.05762. doi:10.4007/annals.2019.189.2.3. JSTOR 10.4007/annals.2019.189.2.3. S2CID 56339965.
- Habegger, Philipp (2009). "Intersecting subvarieties of abelian varieties with algebraic subgroups of complementary dimension". Inventiones Mathematicae. 176 (2): 405–447. doi:10.1007/s00222-008-0170-6. hdl:20.500.11850/156804. ISSN 0020-9910. S2CID 122167169.
- Habegger, Philipp (2013). "Small height and infinite nonabelian extensions". Duke Mathematical Journal. 162 (11): 2027–2076. arXiv:1109.5859. doi:10.1215/00127094-2331342. ISSN 0012-7094. S2CID 119435006.
- Habegger, Philipp (2013). "Special points on fibered powers of elliptic surfaces". Journal für die reine und angewandte Mathematik. 2013 (685). arXiv:1110.1908. doi:10.1515/crelle-2012-0007. ISSN 0075-4102. S2CID 119138713.
- Habegger, P.; Pila, J. (2012). "Some unlikely intersections beyond André–Oort". Compositio Mathematica. 148 (1): 1–27. doi:10.1112/S0010437X11005604. ISSN 0010-437X.
