= Thue's lemma =

Representation of modular integers by "small" fractions

In modular arithmetic, Thue's lemma roughly states that every modular integer may be represented by a "modular fraction" such that the numerator and the denominator have absolute values not greater than the square root of the modulus.

More precisely, for every pair of integers (a, m) with m > 1, given two positive integers X and Y such that X ≤ m < XY, there are two integers x and y such that

$$ay \equiv x \pmod{m}$$

and

$$|x| < X,\quad 0 < y < Y.$$

Usually, one takes X and Y equal to the smallest integer greater than the square root of m, but the general form is sometimes useful, and makes the uniqueness theorem (below) easier to state.

The first known proof is attributed to Axel Thue who used a pigeonhole argument.

Thue's lemma can be used to prove Fermat's theorem on sums of two squares by taking m to be a prime p that is congruent to 1 modulo 4 and taking a to satisfy a^{2} + 1 ≡ 0 mod p. The existence of such an a follows from Wilson's theorem.

== Uniqueness ==
In general, the solution whose existence is asserted by Thue's lemma is not unique. For example, when a = 1 there are usually several solutions (x, y) = (1, 1), (2, 2), (3, 3), ..., provided that X and Y are not too small. Therefore, one may only hope for uniqueness for the rational number x/y, to which a is congruent modulo m if y and m are coprime. Nevertheless, this rational number need not be unique; for example, if m = 5, a = 2 and X = Y = 3, one has the two solutions

$$2a+1 \equiv -a+2 \equiv 0 \pmod 5$$.

However, for X and Y small enough, if a solution exists, it is unique. More precisely, with above notation, if

$$2XY < m,$$

and

$$ay_1-x_1\equiv ay_2-x_2 \equiv 0 \pmod m$$,

with

$$\left | x_1\right |< X, \quad\left| y_1\right| < Y,$$

and

$$\left| x_2\right| < X, \quad\left| y_2\right| < Y,$$

then

$$\frac{x_1}{y_1}=\frac{x_2}{y_2}.$$

This result is the basis for rational reconstruction, which allows using modular arithmetic for computing rational numbers for which one knows bounds for numerators and denominators.

The proof is rather easy: by multiplying each congruence by the other y_{i} and subtracting, one gets

$$y_2x_1-y_1x_2 \equiv 0 \pmod m.$$

The hypotheses imply that each term has an absolute value lower than XY < m/2, and thus that the absolute value of their difference is lower than m. This implies that $y_2x_1-y_1x_2 =0$, hence the result.

== Computing solutions ==
The original proof of Thue's lemma is not efficient, in the sense that it does not provide any fast method for computing the solution. The extended Euclidean algorithm, allows us to provide a proof that leads to an efficient algorithm that has the same computational complexity of the Euclidean algorithm.

More precisely, given the two integers m and a appearing in Thue's lemma, the extended Euclidean algorithm computes three sequences of integers (t_{i}), (x_{i}) and (y_{i}) such that

$$t_im+y_ia =x_i \quad \text{for } i=0, 1, ...,$$

where the x_{i} are non-negative and strictly decreasing. The desired solution is, up to the sign, the first pair (x_{i}, y_{i}) such that x_{i} < X.

== See also ==
- Padé approximant, a similar theory, for approximating Taylor series by rational functions
