= Brocard's problem =

In mathematics, when is n!+1 a square

Unsolved problem in mathematics
Does $n!+1=m^2$ have integer solutions other than $n=4,5,7$?
More unsolved problems in mathematics

Brocard's problem is a problem in mathematics that seeks integer values of $n$ such that $n!+1$ is a perfect square, where $n!$ is the factorial. Only three values of $n$ are known — 4, 5, 7 — and it is not known whether there are any more. Though research has extended far beyond n > 7, no additional solutions to the equation n! + 1 = m^{2} are known.

More formally, it seeks pairs of integers $n$ and $m$ such that
$$n!+1 = m^2.$$
The problem was posed by Henri Brocard in a pair of articles in 1876 and 1885, and independently in 1913 by Srinivasa Ramanujan.

== Brown numbers ==
Pairs of the numbers $(n,m)$ that solve Brocard's problem were named Brown numbers by Clifford A. Pickover in his 1995 book Keys to Infinity, after learning of the problem from Kevin S. Brown. As of October 2022, there are only three known pairs of Brown numbers:

(4,5), (5,11), and (7,71),

based on the equalities

4! + 1 = 5^{2} = 25,
5! + 1 = 11^{2} = 121, and
7! + 1 = 71^{2} = 5041.

Paul Erdős conjectured that no other solutions exist. Computational searches have found no further solutions with $n \leq 10^{15}$.

== Connection to the abc conjecture ==
It would follow from the abc conjecture that there are only finitely many Brown numbers. More generally, it would also follow from the abc conjecture that
$$n!+A = k^2$$
has only finitely many solutions, for any given integer $A$, and that
$$n! = P(x)$$
has only finitely many integer solutions, for any given polynomial $P(x)$ of degree at least 2 with integer coefficients.
