= Frobenioid =

In arithmetic geometry, a Frobenioid is a category with some extra structure that generalizes the theory of line bundles on models of finite extensions of global fields. Frobenioids were introduced by Shinichi Mochizuki (2008). The word "Frobenioid" is a portmanteau of Frobenius and monoid, as certain Frobenius morphisms between Frobenioids are analogues of the usual Frobenius morphism, and some of the simplest examples of Frobenioids are essentially monoids.

== The Frobenioid of a monoid ==
If M is a commutative monoid, it is acted on naturally by the monoid N of positive integers under multiplication, with an element n of N multiplying an element of M by n. The Frobenioid of M is the semidirect product of M and N. The underlying category of this Frobenioid is the category of the monoid, with one object and a morphism for each element of the monoid. The standard Frobenioid is the special case of this construction when M is the additive monoid of non-negative integers.

== Elementary Frobenioids ==
An elementary Frobenioid is a generalization of the Frobenioid of a commutative monoid, given by a sort of semidirect product of the monoid of positive integers by a family Φ of commutative monoids over a base category D. In applications the category D is sometimes the category of models of finite separable extensions of a global field, and Φ corresponds to the line bundles on these models, and the action of a positive integer n in N is given by taking the nth power of a line bundle.

== Frobenioids and poly-Frobenioids ==
A Frobenioid consists of a category C together with a functor to an elementary Frobenioid, satisfying some complicated conditions related to the behavior of line bundles and divisors on models of global fields. One of Mochizuki's fundamental theorems states that under various conditions a Frobenioid can be reconstructed from the category C. A poly-Frobenioid is an extension of a Frobenioid.

== See also ==
- Category theory
- Anabelian geometry
- Inter-universal Teichmüller theory
