= Roth's theorem =

Algebraic numbers are not near many rationals

In mathematics, Roth's theorem or Thue–Siegel–Roth theorem is a fundamental result in diophantine approximation to algebraic numbers. It is of a qualitative type, stating that algebraic numbers cannot have many rational approximations that are 'very good'. Over half a century, the meaning of very good here was refined by a number of mathematicians, starting with Joseph Liouville in 1844 and continuing with work of Axel Thue (1909), Carl Ludwig Siegel (1921), Freeman Dyson (1947), and culminating with Klaus Roth (1955).

This machinery was originally developed to prove Thue's theorem in Diophantine geometry, that Thue equations (bivariate homogeneous of degree at least 3) possess only finitely many integer solutions.

== Statement ==
Roth's theorem states that every irrational algebraic number $\alpha$ has irrationality exponent equal to 2. This means that, for every $\varepsilon>0$, the inequality

$$\left|\alpha - \frac{p}{q}\right| < \frac{1}{q^{2 + \varepsilon}}$$

can have only finitely many solutions in coprime integers $p$ and $q$. Roth's proof of this fact resolved a conjecture by Siegel. Equivalently, for every irrational algebraic number $\alpha$ and $\varepsilon>0$, there is a constant $C(\alpha,\epsilon)$ satisfying

$$\left|\alpha - \frac{p}{q}\right| >
\frac{C(\alpha,\varepsilon)}{q^{2 + \varepsilon}}.$$

== Discussion ==
Dirichlet showed that any real number $\alpha$ has rational approximations which are close with respect to their denominators: when $\alpha$ is irrational, Dirichlet theorem implies that there exist infinitely many coprime integers $p,q$ with

$\left|\alpha - \frac{p}{q}\right| < \frac{1}{q^2}.$

Searching for even closer approximations, one defines the irrationality exponent $\mu(\alpha)$ as the supremum of $\mu$ such that there exist infinitely many coprime integers $p,q$ with

$\left|\alpha - \frac{p}{q}\right| < \frac{1}{q^{\mu}},$

so that Dirichlet's theorem gives $\mu(\alpha)\geq 2$ when $\alpha$ is irrational. The first upper bound, restricting the accuracy of rational approximations, was Liouville's theorem which gives $\mu(\alpha)\leq d$ for an algebraic number $\alpha$ of degree $d\geq2$: for any $\epsilon>0$, there are only finitely many coprime integers $p,q$ satisfying

$\left|\alpha - \frac{p}{q}\right| < \frac{1}{q^{d + \varepsilon}}.$

This is already enough to demonstrate the existence of transcendental numbers. Thue realised that lowering this bound would have applications to the solution of Diophantine equations, and in Thue's theorem from 1909 established $\mu(\alpha) \leq d/2 + 1$, which he applied to prove the finiteness of the solutions of Thue equations. Siegel's theorem improves this to an exponent about $2\sqrt{d}$, and Dyson's theorem of 1947 has exponent about $\sqrt{2d}$.

Roth's result gives the best possible bound $\mu(\alpha)\leq 2$, and hence $\mu(\alpha) = 2$, for all irrational algebraic numbers $\alpha$. However, there is a stronger conjecture of Serge Lang that

$$\left|\alpha - \frac{p}{q}\right| < \frac{1}{q^2 \log(q)^{1+\varepsilon}}$$

can have only finitely many solutions in integers p and q.

If one lets $\alpha$ run over the whole of the set of real numbers, not just the algebraic reals, then both Roth's conclusion and Lang's hold for almost all $\alpha$. So both the theorem and the conjecture assert that a certain countable set misses a certain set of measure zero.

The theorem is not currently effective: that is, there is no bound known on the possible values of $p$ and $q$ given $\alpha$. Davenport & Roth (1955) showed that Roth's techniques could be used to give an effective bound for the number of $p$ and $q$ satisfying the inequality, using a "gap" principle.

== Proof technique ==
The proof technique involves constructing an auxiliary multivariate polynomial in an arbitrarily large number of variables depending upon $\varepsilon$, leading to a contradiction in the presence of too many good approximations. More specifically, one finds a certain number of rational approximations to the irrational algebraic number in question, and then applies the function over each of these simultaneously (i.e. each of these rational numbers serve as the input to a unique variable in the expression defining our function). By its nature, it was ineffective (see effective results in number theory); this is of particular interest since a major application of this type of result is to bound the number of solutions of some Diophantine equations.

== Generalizations ==
There is a higher-dimensional version, Schmidt's subspace theorem, of the basic result. There are also numerous extensions, for example using the p-adic metric, based on the Roth method.

William J. LeVeque generalized the result by showing that a similar bound holds when the approximating numbers are taken from a fixed algebraic number field. Define the height $H(\xi)$ of an algebraic number $\xi$ to be the maximum of the absolute values of the coefficients of its minimal polynomial. Fix $\kappa>2$. For a given algebraic number $\alpha$ and algebraic number field $K$, the equation

$$|\alpha - \xi| < \frac{1}{H(\xi)^\kappa}$$

has only finitely many solutions in elements $\xi$ of $K$.

== See also ==
- Davenport–Schmidt theorem
- Granville–Langevin conjecture
- Størmer's theorem
- Diophantine geometry
