= David Masser =

British mathematician

David Masser FRS
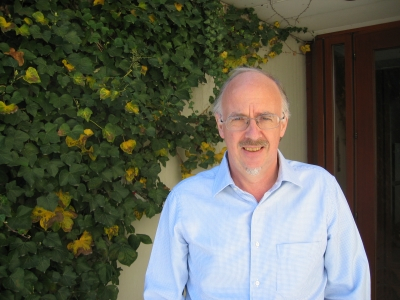
- Masser in 2007
- Born: 8 November 1948 (age 77); London, United Kingdom
- Education: University of Cambridge
- Known for: Masser–Gramain constant Oesterlé–Masser conjecture Sparsely totient number
- Awards: ICM Speaker (1983); Humboldt Prize (1991); Fellow of the Royal Society (2005); Member of the Academia Europaea (2014)
- Scientific career
- Fields: Mathematics
- Workplaces: University of Basel
- Doctoral advisor: Alan Baker
- Doctoral students: Philipp Habegger; Paula Tretkoff

David William Masser FRS (born 8 November 1948) is professor emeritus in the Department of Mathematics and Computer Science at the University of Basel. He is known for his work in transcendental number theory, Diophantine approximation, and Diophantine geometry. With Joseph Oesterlé in 1985, Masser formulated the abc conjecture, which has been called "the most important unsolved problem in Diophantine analysis".

== Early life and education ==
Masser was born on 8 November 1948 in London, England. He graduated from Trinity College, Cambridge with a B.A. (Hons) in 1970. In 1974, he obtained his M.A. and Ph.D. at the University of Cambridge, with a doctoral thesis under the supervision of Alan Baker titled Elliptic Functions and Transcendence.

== Career ==
Masser was a Lecturer at the University of Nottingham from 1973 to 1975, before spending the 1975–1976 year as a Research Fellow of Trinity College at the University of Cambridge. He returned to the University of Nottingham to serve as a Lecturer from 1976 to 1979 and then as a Reader from 1979 to 1983. He was a professor at the University of Michigan from 1983 to 1992. He then moved to the Mathematics Institute at the University of Basel and became emeritus there in 2014.

== Research ==
Masser's research focuses on transcendental number theory, Diophantine approximation, and Diophantine geometry. The abc conjecture originated as the outcome of attempts by Oesterlé and Masser to understand the Szpiro conjecture about elliptic curves.

== Awards ==
Masser was an invited speaker at the International Congress of Mathematicians in Warsaw in 1983. In 1991, he received the Humboldt Prize. He was elected as a Fellow of the Royal Society in 2005. In 2014, he was elected as a Member of the Academia Europaea.

== See also ==
- Analytic subgroup theorem
- Bézout's theorem
- Zilber–Pink conjecture
