= Axel Thue =

Norwegian mathematician (1863–1922)

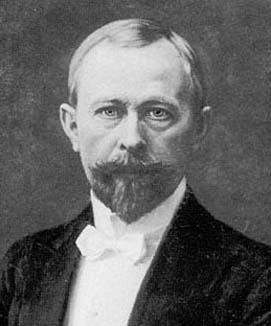
- Axel Thue (1863-1922)
- Born: 19 February 1863; Tønsberg, Norway
- Died: 7 March 1922 (aged 59); Oslo, Norway
- Education: University of Kristiania
- Known for: Thue equation Thue problem Thue's lemma Thue's theorem Thue–Morse sequence Thue–Siegel–Roth theorem Prouhet–Thue–Morse constant
- Awards: Fridtjof Nansen Prize (1913)
- Scientific career
- Fields: Mathematician
- Workplaces: University of Kristiania; Trondheim Technical College
- Thesis: (1889)
- Doctoral advisor: Elling Holst
- Doctoral students: Thoralf Skolem

Axel Thue (Norwegian: [tʉː]; 19 February 1863 – 7 March 1922) was a Norwegian mathematician, known for his original work in diophantine approximation and combinatorics.

== Work ==
Thue published his first important paper in 1909.

He stated in 1914 the so-called word problem for semigroups or Thue problem, closely related to the halting problem.

His only known PhD student was Thoralf Skolem.

The esoteric programming language Thue is named after him.

== Publications ==
- Thue, A. (1909), "Über Annäherungswerte algebraischer Zahlen", Journal für die reine und angewandte Mathematik, 1909 (135): 284–305, doi:10.1515/crll.1909.135.284, ISSN 0075-4102, S2CID 125903243
- Thue, A. (1977) [1912], "Über die gegenseitige Lage gleicher Teile gewisser Zeichenreihen", Selected Math. Papers of Axel Thue, Universiteitsforlaget: 67

== See also ==
- Thue equation – Type of equation with integer coefficients
- Thue number
- Thue's lemma – Representation of modular integers by "small" fractions
- Semi-Thue system – String rewriting system
- Thue–Morse sequence – Infinite binary sequence generated by repeated complementation and concatenation
- Roth's theorem – Algebraic numbers are not near many rationals
- Plastic ratio – Number, approximately 1.3247
- Word problem for groups – Problem in finite group theory
