= Joseph Oesterlé =

French mathematician (born 1954)

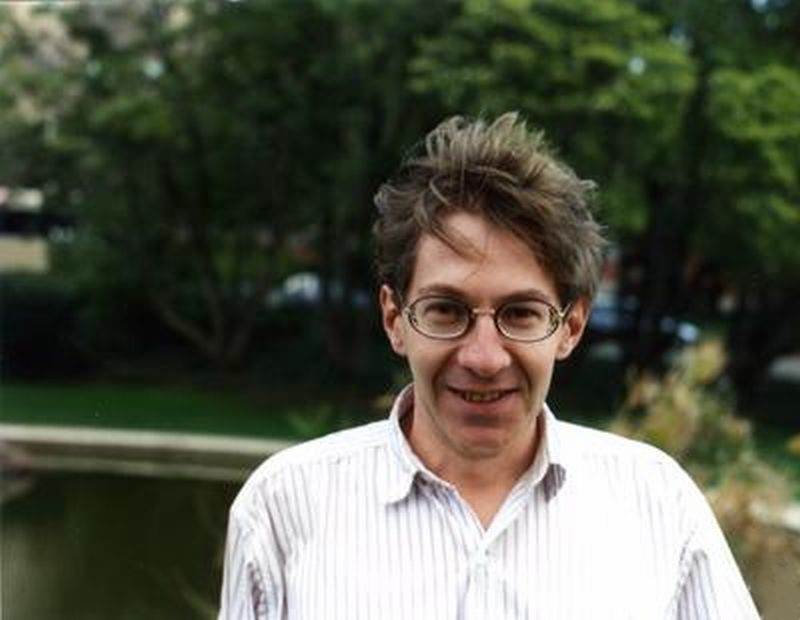
- Oesterlé in 1989
- Born: 1954 (age 71–72); Alsace, France
- Education: Paris-Sud 11 University
- Known for: abc conjecture
- Scientific career
- Fields: Mathematics
- Workplaces: Pierre and Marie Curie University
- Doctoral students: Loïc Merel

Joseph Oesterlé (born 1954) is a French mathematician who, along with David Masser, formulated the abc conjecture which has been called "the most important unsolved problem in diophantine analysis".

He is a member of Bourbaki.
