= Jakob Stix =

German mathematician (born 1974)

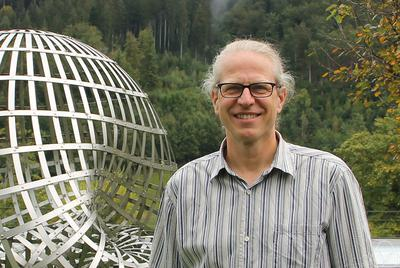
Stix at Oberwolfach in 2024

Jakob M. Stix (born in 1974) is a German mathematician. He specializes in arithmetic algebraic geometry (étale fundamental group, anabelian geometry and other topics).

Stix studied mathematics in Freiburg and Bonn and received his doctorate in 2002 from Florian Pop at the University of Bonn (Projective Anabelian Curves in Positive Characteristic and Descent Theory for Log-Etale Covers). His dissertation was awarded the best doctoral thesis of the year 2002 by the Mathematical Institute of the University of Bonn. He was a post-doctoral student at the Institute for Advanced Study. In 2008, he became junior research group leader at the Mathematics Center of the University of Heidelberg, where he habilitated in 2011 (Evidence for the section conjecture in the theory of arithmetic fundamental groups). Stix is now a professor at the University of Frankfurt.

== Notable publications ==
- with Alexander Schmidt: "Anabelian geometry with étale homotopy types", Annals of Mathematics, volume 184, 2016, pp. 817–868, Arxiv
- "Rational points and arithmetic of fundamental groups : evidence for the section conjecture", Lecture Notes in mathematics 2054, Springer 2013 (Habilitation thesis)
- "The Brauer–Manin obstruction for sections of the fundamental group", Journal of Pure and Applied Algebra, volume 215, 2011, pp. 1371–1397 Arxiv
- "On the birational section conjecture with local conditions", Inventiones mathematicae, volume 199, 2015, pp. 239–265
- as publisher: The Arithmetic of Fundamental Groups : PIA 2010, Springer, 2012
