= Alan Baker (mathematician) =

English mathematician (1939–2018)

Alan Baker FRS
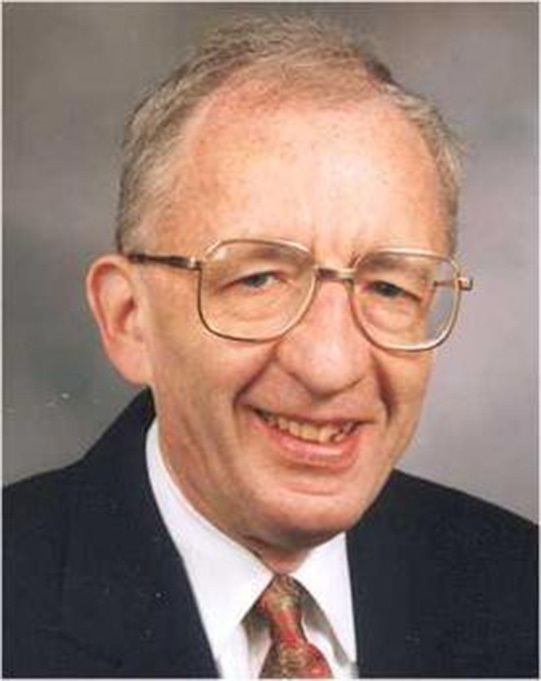
- Born: 19 August 1939; London, England
- Died: 4 February 2018 (aged 78); Cambridge, England
- Education: University College London; University of Cambridge
- Known for: Number theory Diophantine equations Baker's theorem Baker–Heegner–Stark theorem
- Awards: Fields Medal (1970); Adams Prize (1972)
- Scientific career
- Fields: Mathematics
- Workplaces: University of Cambridge
- Thesis: Some Aspects of Diophantine Approximation (1964)
- Doctoral advisor: Harold Davenport
- Doctoral students: John Coates; Yuval Flicker; Roger Heath-Brown; David Masser; Cameron Stewart

Alan Baker FRS (19 August 1939 – 4 February 2018) was an English mathematician, known for his work on effective methods in number theory, in particular those arising from transcendental number theory.

== Life ==
Alan Baker was born into a Jewish family in London on 19 August 1939. He attended Stratford Grammar School, East London, and his academic career started as a student of Harold Davenport, at University College London and later at Trinity College, Cambridge, where he received his PhD. He was a visiting scholar at the Institute for Advanced Study in 1970 when he was awarded the Fields Medal at the age of 31. In 1974 he was appointed Professor of Pure Mathematics at Cambridge University, a position he held until 2006 when he became an Emeritus. He was a fellow of Trinity College from 1964 until his death.

His interests were in number theory, transcendence, linear forms in logarithms, effective methods, Diophantine geometry and Diophantine analysis.

In 2012 he became a fellow of the American Mathematical Society. He has also been made a foreign fellow of the National Academy of Sciences, India.

== Research ==
Baker generalised the Gelfond–Schneider theorem, which itself is a solution to Hilbert's seventh problem. Specifically, Baker showed that if $\alpha_1,...,\alpha_n$ are algebraic numbers (besides 0 or 1), and if $\beta_1,..,\beta_n$ are irrational algebraic numbers such that the set $\{1,\beta_1,...,\beta_n\}$ is linearly independent over the rational numbers, then the number $\alpha_1^{\beta_1}\alpha_2^{\beta_2}\cdots\alpha_n^{\beta_n}$ is transcendental.

Baker made significant contributions to several areas in number theory, such as the Gauss class number problem, diophantine approximation, and to Diophantine equations such as the Mordell curve.

== Selected publications ==
- Baker, Alan (1966), "Linear forms in the logarithms of algebraic numbers. I", Mathematika, 13 (2): 204–216, doi:10.1112/S0025579300003971, ISSN 0025-5793, MR 0220680
- Baker, Alan (1967a), "Linear forms in the logarithms of algebraic numbers. II", Mathematika, 14: 102–107, doi:10.1112/S0025579300008068, ISSN 0025-5793, MR 0220680
- Baker, Alan (1967b), "Linear forms in the logarithms of algebraic numbers. III", Mathematika, 14 (2): 220–228, doi:10.1112/S0025579300003843, ISSN 0025-5793, MR 0220680
- Baker, Alan (1990), Transcendental number theory, Cambridge Mathematical Library (2nd ed.), Cambridge University Press, ISBN 978-0-521-39791-9, MR 0422171; 1st edition. 1975.
- Baker, Alan; Wüstholz, G. (2007), Logarithmic forms and Diophantine geometry, New Mathematical Monographs, vol. 9, Cambridge University Press, ISBN 978-0-521-88268-2, MR 2382891

== Honours and awards ==
- 1970: Fields Medal
- 1972: Adams Prize
- 1973: Fellowship of the Royal Society
