= Quadratic Gauss sum =

Sum type in number theory

In number theory, quadratic Gauss sums are finite sums of roots of unity. A quadratic Gauss sum can be interpreted as a linear combination of values of the complex exponential function with coefficients given by a quadratic character; for a general character, one obtains a broader Gauss sum. These sums are named after Carl Friedrich Gauss, who studied them extensively and applied them to the quadratic, cubic, and biquadratic reciprocity laws.

== Definition ==
For an odd prime number p and an integer a, the quadratic Gauss sum g(a; p) is defined as

$$g(a;p) = \sum_{n=0}^{p-1}\zeta_p^{an^2},$$

where $\zeta_p$ is a primitive pth root of unity, such as $\zeta_p=\exp(2\pi i/p)$. Equivalently, using the Legendre symbol, it can be written as

$$g(a;p) = \sum_{n=0}^{p-1}\big(1+\left(\tfrac{n}{p}\right)\big)\,\zeta_p^{an}.$$

When a is divisible by p, we have $\zeta_p^{an^2}=1$ and thus

$$g(a;p) = p.$$

When a is not divisible by p, we have $\sum_{n=0}^{p-1} \zeta_p^{an} = 0$, which implies that

$$g(a;p) = \sum_{n=0}^{p-1}\left(\tfrac{n}{p}\right)\,\zeta_p^{an} = G(a,\left(\tfrac{\cdot}{p}\right)),$$

where

$$G(a,\chi)=\sum_{n=0}^{p-1}\chi(n)\,\zeta_p^{an}$$

is the Gauss sum defined for any character χ modulo p.

== Properties ==
- The value of the Gauss sum is an algebraic integer in the pth cyclotomic field $\mathbb{Q}(\zeta_p)$.
- Evaluating the Gauss sum for an integer a not divisible by an odd prime p > 2 reduces to the case a = 1:

$$g(a;p)=\left(\tfrac{a}{p}\right)g(1;p).$$

- The exact value of the Gauss sum for a = 1 is given by the formula:

$$g(1;p) =\sum_{n=0}^{p-1}e^\frac{2\pi in^2}{p}=
\begin{cases}
(1+i)\sqrt{p} & \text{if}\ p\equiv 0 \pmod 4, \\
\sqrt{p} & \text{if}\ p\equiv 1\pmod 4, \\
0 & \text{if}\ p \equiv 2 \pmod 4, \\
i\sqrt{p} & \text{if}\ p\equiv 3\pmod 4.
\end{cases}$$

Remark

The identity

$$g(1;p)^2=\left(\tfrac{-1}{p}\right)p$$

was straightforward to prove and led to one of Gauss's proofs of quadratic reciprocity. Determining the sign of the Gauss sum, however, proved considerably more difficult: Gauss established it only after several years of work. Later, Dirichlet, Kronecker, Schur, and other mathematicians found alternative proofs.

== Generalized quadratic Gauss sums ==
Let a, b, c be natural numbers. The generalized quadratic Gauss sum G(a, b, c) is defined by

$$G(a,b,c)=\sum_{n=0}^{c-1} e^{2\pi i\frac{a n^2+bn}{c}}$$.

The classical quadratic Gauss sum is given by g(a, p) = G(a, 0, p).

Properties

- The Gauss sum G(a,b,c) depends only on the residue classes of a and b modulo c.
- Gauss sums are multiplicative; that is, given natural numbers a, b, c, d with gcd(c, d) = 1, one has

$$G(a,b,cd)=G(ac,b,d)G(ad,b,c).$$

This follows directly from the Chinese remainder theorem.

- One has G(a, b, c) = 0 whenever gcd(a, c) > 1, except when gcd(a,c) divides b, in which case

$$G(a,b,c)= \gcd(a,c) \cdot G\left(\frac{a}{\gcd(a,c)},\frac{b}{\gcd(a,c)},\frac{c}{\gcd(a,c)}\right)$$.

Thus, when evaluating quadratic Gauss sums, one may always assume gcd(a, c) = 1.

- Let a, b, c be integers with ac ≠ 0 and ac + b even. The following analogue of the quadratic reciprocity law holds for these more general Gauss sums:

$$\sum_{n=0}^{|c|-1} e^{\pi i \frac{a n^2+bn}{c}} = \left|\frac{c}{a}\right|^\frac12 e^{\pi i \frac{|ac|-b^2}{4ac}} \sum_{n=0}^{|a|-1} e^{-\pi i \frac{c n^2+b n}{a}}$$.

- Define

$$\varepsilon_m = \begin{cases} 1 & \text{if}\ m\equiv 1\pmod 4 \\ i & \text{if}\ m\equiv 3\pmod 4 \end{cases}$$

for every odd integer m. The values of Gauss sums with b = 0 and gcd(a, c) = 1 are explicitly given by

$$G(a,c) = G(a,0,c) =
\begin{cases}
0 & \text{if}\ c\equiv 2\pmod 4 \\
\varepsilon_c \sqrt{c} \left(\dfrac{a}{c}\right) & \text{if}\ c\equiv 1\pmod 2 \\
(1+i) \varepsilon_a^{-1} \sqrt{c} \left(\dfrac{c}{a}\right) & \text{if}\ c\equiv 0\pmod 4.
\end{cases}$$

Here (a/c) denotes the Jacobi symbol. This is the well-known formula of Carl Friedrich Gauss.

- For b > 0, Gauss sums can usually be computed readily by completing the square. That approach fails in certain cases—such as when c is even and b is odd—which can be handled by other methods. For instance, if c is odd and gcd(a, c) = 1, one has

$$G(a,b,c) =  \varepsilon_c \sqrt{c} \cdot \left(\frac{a}{c}\right) e^{-2\pi i \frac{\psi(a) b^2}{c}},$$

where ψ(a) is a number satisfying 4ψ(a)a ≡ 1 (mod c). As another case, if 4 divides c, b is odd, and gcd(a, c) = 1, then G(a, b, c) = 0. This can be shown by using multiplicativity to reduce the problem to showing that G(a, b, 2^{m}) = 0 when m > 1 and a, b are odd with gcd(a, c) = 1. When b is odd, $an^2 + bn$ is even for all $0 \le n < 2^m - 1$. For each q, the equation $an^2 + bn + q = 0$ has at most two solutions in $\mathbb{Z}/2^m\mathbb{Z}$. Indeed, if $n_1$ and $n_2$ are two solutions of the same parity, then $(n_1 - n_2)(a(n_1 + n_2) +b) = \alpha 2^m$ for some integer $\alpha$; since $(a(n_1 + n_2) +b)$ is odd, it follows that $n_1 \equiv n_2 \pmod{2^m}$. By a counting argument, $an^2 + bn$ takes each even residue class modulo c twice, and the geometric sum formula then yields G(a, b, 2^{m}) = 0.

- If c is an odd square-free integer and gcd(a, c) = 1, then

$$G(a,0,c) = \sum_{n=0}^{c-1} \left(\frac{n}{c}\right) e^\frac{2\pi i a n}{c}.$$

If c is not squarefree, the right-hand side vanishes while the left-hand side does not. Often the sum on the right is also called a quadratic Gauss sum.

- Another useful identity,

$$G\left(n,p^k\right) = p\cdot G\left(n,p^{k-2}\right)$$

holds for k ≥ 2 and an odd prime number p, as well as for k ≥ 4 and p = 2.

== See also ==
- Gauss sum
- Gaussian period
- Kummer sum
- Landsberg–Schaar relation
