= Jacobi sum =

Number-theoretic concept

In mathematics, a Jacobi sum is a type of character sum formed with Dirichlet characters. Simple examples would be Jacobi sums J(χ, ψ) for Dirichlet characters χ, ψ modulo a prime number p, defined by

$$J(\chi,\psi) = \sum \chi(a) \psi(1 - a) \,,$$

where the summation runs over all residues a = 2, 3, ..., p − 1 mod p (for which neither a nor 1 − a is 0). Jacobi sums are the analogues for finite fields of the beta function. Such sums were introduced by C. G. J. Jacobi early in the nineteenth century in connection with the theory of cyclotomy. Jacobi sums J can be factored generically into products of powers of Gauss sums g. For example, when the character χψ is nontrivial,

$$J(\chi, \psi) = \frac{g(\chi)g(\psi)}{g(\chi\psi)}\,,$$

analogous to the formula for the beta function in terms of gamma functions. Since the nontrivial Gauss sums g have absolute value p^{1/2}, it follows that J(χ, ψ) also has absolute value p^{1/2} when the characters χψ, χ, ψ are nontrivial. Jacobi sums J lie in smaller cyclotomic fields than do the nontrivial Gauss sums g. The summands of J(χ, ψ) for example involve no pth root of unity, but rather involve just values which lie in the cyclotomic field of (p − 1)th roots of unity. Like Gauss sums, Jacobi sums have known prime ideal factorisations in their cyclotomic fields; see Stickelberger's theorem.

When χ is the Legendre symbol,

$$J(\chi, \chi) = -\chi(-1) = (-1)^\frac{p+1}{2} \,.$$

In general the values of Jacobi sums occur in relation with the local zeta-functions of diagonal forms. The result on the Legendre symbol amounts to the formula p + 1 for the number of points on a conic section that is a projective line over the field of p elements. A paper of André Weil from 1949 very much revived the subject. Indeed, through the Hasse–Davenport relation of the late 20th century, the formal properties of powers of Gauss sums had become current once more.

As well as pointing out the possibility of writing down local zeta-functions for diagonal hypersurfaces by means of general Jacobi sums, Weil (1952) demonstrated the properties of Jacobi sums as Hecke characters. This was to become important once the complex multiplication of abelian varieties became established. The Hecke characters in question were exactly those one needs to express the Hasse–Weil L-functions of the Fermat curves, for example. The exact conductors of these characters, a question Weil had left open, were determined in later work.
