= Georg Landsberg =

German mathematician

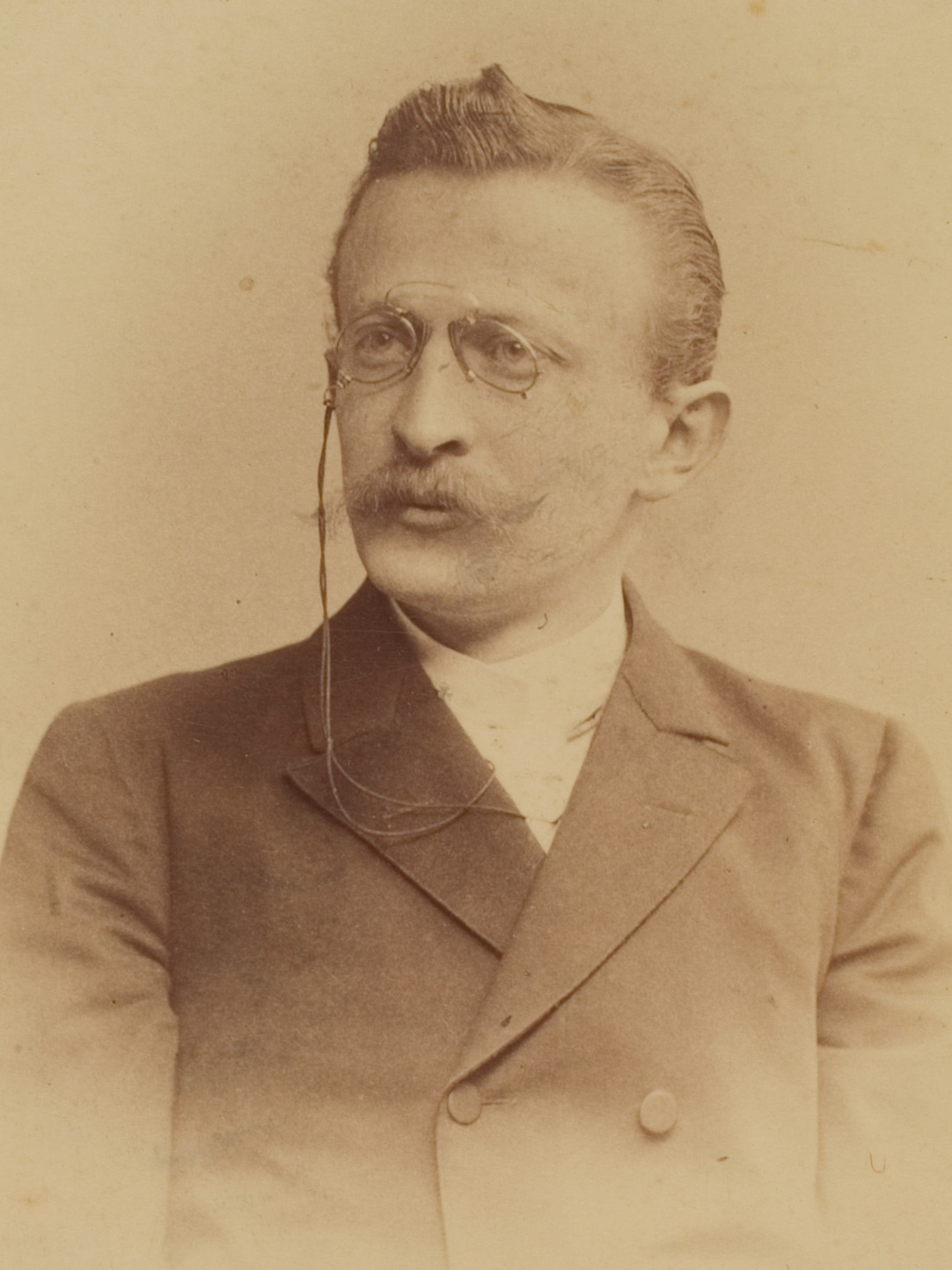
Georg Landsberg

Georg Landsberg (January 30, 1865 – September 14, 1912) was a German mathematician, known for his work in the theory of algebraic functions and on the Riemann–Roch theorem. The Takagi–Landsberg curve, a fractal that is the graph of a nowhere-differentiable but uniformly continuous function, is named after Teiji Takagi and him.

== Education and career ==
Landsberg was Jewish. He was born in Breslau, and earned a doctorate from the University of Breslau in 1890. He taught at the University of Heidelberg from 1893 to 1904, when he returned to Breslau as an extraordinary professor of mathematics. In 1906 he moved again, to the University of Kiel, where he was promoted in 1911; Werner Fenchel has called him "undoubtedly the most prominent" of the mathematicians at Kiel at this time. Sources differ on whether he died in Kiel or Berlin.

== Mathematical research ==
Landsberg studied the theory of functions of two variables and also the theory of higher dimensional curves. In particular he studied the role of these curves in the calculus of variations and in mechanics.

He worked with ideas related to those of Weierstrass, Riemann and Heinrich Weber on theta functions and Gaussian sums. His most important work, however was his contribution to the development of the theory of algebraic functions of a single variable. Here he studied the Riemann-Roch theorem.

He was able to combine Riemann's function theoretic approach with the Italian geometric approach and with the Weierstrass arithmetical approach. His arithmetic setting of this result led eventually to the modern abstract theory of algebraic functions.

== Works ==
One of his most important works was Theorie der algebraischen Funktionen einer Variablen (Leipzig, 1902) which he wrote jointly with Kurt Hensel. This textbook has been described as "a classic in its field" and continued to be used for many years.

== See also ==
- Landsberg–Schaar relation
