= Ankeny–Artin–Chowla congruence =

Concerns the class number of a real quadratic field of discriminant > 0

In number theory, the Ankeny–Artin–Chowla congruence is a result published in 1953 by N. C. Ankeny, Emil Artin and S. Chowla. It concerns the class number h of a real quadratic field of discriminant d > 0. If the fundamental unit of the field is

$$\varepsilon = \frac{t + u \sqrt{d}}{2}$$

with integers t and u, it expresses in another form

$$\frac{ht}{u} \pmod{p}\;$$

for any prime number p > 2 that divides d. In case p > 3 it states that

$$-2{mht \over u} \equiv \sum_{0 < k < d} {\chi(k) \over k}\lfloor {k/p} \rfloor \pmod {p}$$

where $m = \frac{d}{p}\;$ and $\chi\;$ is the Dirichlet character for the quadratic field. For p = 3 there is a factor (1 + m) multiplying the LHS. Here

$$\lfloor x\rfloor$$

represents the floor function of x.

A related result is that if d=p is congruent to one mod four, then

$${u \over t}h \equiv B_{(p-1)/2} \pmod{ p}$$

where B_{n} is the nth Bernoulli number.

There are some generalisations of these basic results, in the papers of the authors.

== See also ==
- Herbrand–Ribet theorem, similar for ideal class groups of cyclotomic fields.
