= Kummer's conjecture =

In mathematics, Kummer's conjecture is either of two the conjectures made by Ernst Eduard Kummer:

- The Kummer–Vandiver conjecture about class numbers of cyclotomic fields
- Kummer's conjecture about the Kummer sum
