= Diagonal form =

Type of homogenous polynomial

In mathematics, a diagonal form is an algebraic form (homogeneous polynomial) without cross-terms involving different indeterminates. That is, it is of the form

$$\sum_{i=1}^n a_i {x_i}^m\$$

for some degree m.

Such forms F, and the hypersurfaces F = 0 they define in projective space, are very special in geometric terms, with many symmetries. They also include famous cases like the Fermat curves, and other examples well known in the theory of Diophantine equations.

A great deal has been worked out about their theory: algebraic geometry, local zeta-functions via Jacobi sums, Hardy-Littlewood circle method.

== Diagonalization ==
Over a field of characteristic not equal to 2, any degree-2 homogeneous polynomial (quadratic form) can be transformed to a diagonal form by variable substitution. Higher-degree homogeneous polynomials can be diagonalized if and only if their catalecticant is non-zero.

The process is particularly simple for quadratic forms, based on the eigenvalues of the symmetric matrix representing the quadratic form.

== Examples ==
$X^2+Y^2-Z^2 = 0$ is the unit circle in P^{2}
$X^2-Y^2-Z^2 = 0$ is the unit hyperbola in P^{2}.
$x_0^3+x_1^3+x_2^3+x_3^3=0$ gives the Fermat cubic surface in P^{3} with 27 lines. The 27 lines in this example are easy to describe explicitly: they are the 9 lines of the form (x : ax : y : by) where a and b are fixed numbers with cube −1, and their 18 conjugates under permutations of coordinates.

$x_0^4+x_1^4+x_2^4+x_3^4=0$ gives a K3 surface in P^{3}.
