= Burgess inequality =

In analytic number theory, the Burgess inequality (also called the Burgess bound) is an inequality that provides an upper bound for character sums

$$S_{\chi}(N,H):=\sum\limits_{N+1\leq n\leq N+H} \chi(n)$$

where $\chi$ is a Dirichlet character modulo a cube free $q\in\mathbb{N}$ that is not the principal character $\chi_0$.

The inequality was proven in 1963 along with a series of related inequalities, by the British mathematician David Allan Burgess. It provides a better estimate for small character sums than the Pólya–Vinogradov inequality from 1918. More recent results have led to refinements and generalizations of the Burgess bound.

== Burgess inequality ==
A number is called cube free if it is not divisible by any cubic number $x^3$ except $\pm 1$. Define $r\in \mathbb{N}$ with $r\geq 2$ and $\varepsilon>0$.

Let $\chi$ be a Dirichlet character modulo $q\in\mathbb{N}$ that is not a principal character. For two $N,H\in\mathbb{N}$, define the character sum

$$S_{\chi}(N,H):=\sum\limits_{N+1\leq n\leq N+H} \chi(n).$$

If either $q$ is cube free or $r\leq 3$, then the Burgess inequality holds

$$|S_{\chi}(N,H)|\leq C_{r,\varepsilon} H^{1-1/r}q^{(r+1)/(4r^2)+\varepsilon}$$

for some constant $C_{r,\varepsilon}$.
