= Chowla–Mordell theorem =

When a Gauss sum is the square root of a prime number, multiplied by a root of unity

In mathematics, the Chowla–Mordell theorem says that for a Dirichlet character modulo an odd prime, if the argument of its Gaussian sum is a root of unity, then the character must be quadratic. It is a result in number theory determining cases where a Gauss sum is the square root of a prime number, multiplied by a root of unity. It was proved and published independently by Sarvadaman Chowla and Louis Mordell, around 1951.

== Statement ==
If $p$ is a prime number, $\chi$ a nontrivial Dirichlet character modulo $p$, and

$$G(\chi)=\sum \chi(a) \zeta^a$$

where $\zeta$ is a primitive $p$-th root of unity in the complex numbers, then

$$\frac{G(\chi)}{|G(\chi)|}$$

is a root of unity if and only if $\chi$ is the quadratic residue symbol modulo $p$. The 'if' part was known to Gauss: the contribution of Chowla and Mordell was the 'only if' direction. The ratio in the theorem occurs in the functional equation of L-functions.

== See also ==
- Dirichlet L-function – Type of mathematical function
