= Stickelberger's theorem =

Gives information about the Galois module structure of class groups of cyclotomic fields

In mathematics, Stickelberger's theorem is a result of algebraic number theory, which gives some information about the Galois module structure of class groups of cyclotomic fields. A special case was first proven by Ernst Kummer (1847) while the general result is due to Ludwig Stickelberger (1890).

== The Stickelberger element and the Stickelberger ideal ==
Let $K_m$ denote the $m$th cyclotomic field, i.e. the extension of the rational numbers obtained by adjoining the $m$th roots of unity to $\mathbb{Q}$ (where $m\ge 2$ is an integer). It is a Galois extension of $\mathbb{Q}$ with Galois group $G_m$ isomorphic to the multiplicative group of integers modulo m $(\mathbb{Z}/m\mathbb{Z})^\times$. The Stickelberger element (of level $m$ or of $K_m$) is an element in the group ring $\mathbb{Q}[G_m]$ and the Stickelberger ideal (of level $m$ or of $K_m$) is an ideal in the group ring $\mathbb{Z}[G_m]$. They are defined as follows. Let $\zeta_m$ denote a primitive $m$th root of unity. The isomorphism from $(\mathbb{Z}/m\mathbb{Z})^\times$ to $G_m$ is given by sending an element $a$ to $\sigma_a$ defined by the relation
$$\sigma_a(\zeta_m) = \zeta_m^a.$$
The Stickelberger element of level $m$ is defined as
$$\theta(K_m)=\frac{1}{m}\underset{(a,m)=1}{\sum_{a=1}^m}a\cdot\sigma_a^{-1}\in\Q[G_m].$$
The Stickelberger ideal of level $m$, denoted $I(K_m)$, is the set of integral multiples of $\theta(K_m)$ which have integral coefficients, i.e.
$$I(K_m)=\theta(K_m)\Z[G_m]\cap\Z[G_m].$$

More generally, if $F$ be any Abelian number field whose Galois group over $\Q$ is denoted $G_F$, then the Stickelberger element of $F$ and the Stickelberger ideal of $F$ can be defined. By the Kronecker–Weber theorem there is an integer $m$ such that $F$ is contained in $K_m$. Fix the least such $m$ (this is the (finite part of the) conductor of $F$ over $\Q$). There is a natural group homomorphism $G_m\to G_F$ given by restriction, i.e. if $\sigma_\in G_m$, its image in $G_F$ is its restriction to $F$ denoted $\operatorname{res}_m\sigma$. The Stickelberger element of $F$ is then defined as
$$\theta(F)=\frac{1}{m}\underset{(a,m)=1}{\sum_{a=1}^m}a\cdot\mathrm{res}_m\sigma_a^{-1}\in\Q[G_F].$$
The Stickelberger ideal of $F$, denoted $I(F)$, is defined as in the case of $K_m$, i.e.
$$I(F)=\theta(F)\Z[G_F]\cap\Z[G_F].$$

In the special case where $F=K_m$, the Stickelberger ideal $I(K_m)$ is generated by $(a-\sigma_a)\theta(K_m)$ as $a$ varies over $\Z/m\Z$. This is not true for general $F$.

=== Examples ===
If $F$ is a totally real field of conductor $m$, then
$$\theta(F)=\frac{\varphi(m)}{2[F:\Q]}\sum_{\sigma\in G_F}\sigma,$$
where $\varphi$ is the Euler totient function and $[F:\Q]$ is the degree of $F$ over $\Q$.

== Statement of the theorem ==
Stickelberger's Theorem
Let $F$ be an abelian number field. Then, the Stickelberger ideal of $F$ annihilates the class group of $F$.

Note that $\theta(F)$ itself need not be an annihilator, but any multiple of it in $\Z[G_F]$ is.

Explicitly, the theorem is saying that if $\alpha\in\Z[G_F]$ is such that
$$\alpha\theta(F)=\sum_{\sigma\in G_F}a_\sigma\sigma\in\Z[G_F]$$
and if $J$ is any fractional ideal of $F$, then
$$\prod_{\sigma\in G_F}\sigma\left(J^{a_\sigma}\right)$$
is a principal ideal.

== See also ==
- Gross–Koblitz formula
- Herbrand–Ribet theorem
- Thaine's theorem
- Jacobi sum
- Gauss sum
