= Kummer sum =

In mathematics, Kummer sum is the name given to certain cubic Gauss sums for a prime modulus p, with p congruent to 1 modulo 3. They are named after Ernst Kummer, who made a conjecture about the statistical properties of their arguments, as complex numbers. These sums were known and used before Kummer, in the theory of cyclotomy.

== Definition ==
A Kummer sum is therefore a finite sum

$$\sum \chi(r)e(r/p) = G(\chi)$$

taken over r modulo p, where χ is a Dirichlet character taking values in the cube roots of unity, and where e(x) is the exponential function exp(2πix). Given p of the required form, there are two such characters, together with the trivial character.

The cubic exponential sum K(n,p) defined by

$$K(n,p)=\sum_{x=1}^p e(nx^3/p)$$

is easily seen to be a linear combination of the Kummer sums. In fact it is 3P where P is one of the Gaussian periods for the subgroup of index 3 in the residues mod p, under multiplication, while the Gauss sums are linear combinations of the P with cube roots of unity as coefficients. However it is the Gauss sum for which the algebraic properties hold. Such cubic exponential sums are also now called Kummer sums.

== Statistical questions ==
It is known from the general theory of Gauss sums that

$$|G(\chi)| = \sqrt p. \,$$

In fact the prime decomposition of G(χ) in the cyclotomic field it naturally lies in is known, giving a stronger form. What Kummer was concerned with was the argument

$$\theta_p \,$$

of G(χ). Unlike the quadratic case, where the square of the Gauss sum is known and the precise square root was determined by Gauss, here the cube of G(χ) lies in the Eisenstein integers, but its argument is determined by that of the Eisenstein prime dividing p, which splits in that field.

Kummer made a statistical conjecture about θ_{p} and its distribution modulo 2π (in other words, on the argument of the Kummer sum on the unit circle). For that to make sense, one has to choose between the two possible χ: there is a distinguished choice, in fact, based on the cubic residue symbol. Kummer used available numerical data for p up to 500 (this is described in the 1892 book Theory of Numbers by George B. Mathews). There was, however, a 'law of small numbers' operating, meaning that Kummer's original conjecture, of a lack of uniform distribution, suffered from a small-number bias. In 1952 John von Neumann and Herman Goldstine extended Kummer's computations, on ENIAC. The calculations were programmed and coded by Hedvig Selberg but her work was only acknowledged at the end of the paper, similarly as with Mary Tsingou on the Fermi–Pasta–Ulam–Tsingou problem (formerly the Fermi–Pasta–Ulam problem).

In the twentieth century, progress was finally made on this question, which had been left untouched for over 100 years. Building on work of Tomio Kubota, S. J. Patterson and Roger Heath-Brown in 1978 disproved Kummer conjecture and proved a modified form of Kummer conjecture. In fact they showed that there was equidistribution of the θ_{p}. This work involved automorphic forms for the metaplectic group, and Vaughan's lemma in analytic number theory. In 2000 further refinements were attained by Heath-Brown.

== Cassels' conjecture ==
A second conjecture on Kummer sums was made by J. W. S. Cassels, again building on previous ideas of Tomio Kubota. This was a product formula in terms of elliptic functions with complex multiplication by the Eisenstein integers. The conjecture was proved in 1978 by Charles Matthews.

== Patterson's conjecture ==
In 1978 Patterson conjectured that θ_{p} was equidistributed with error term asymptotically of order $X^{\frac{5}{6}}$ instead of quadratic as with Gauss sums which could explain the initial bias observed by Kummer. Next year his subsequent work with Heath-Brown disproving Kummer's conjecture showed that in fact it was equidistributed, but whether the order of the asymptotic was correct remained unknown. More than 20 years later, Heath-Brown closed on the problem, giving a new sieve method, and conjectured that it could be improved to obtain the predicted order. In 2021 the problem was demonstrated conditionally on the generalized Riemann hypothesis by Alexander Dunn and Maksym Radziwill, who also showed that the sieve of Heath Brown could not be improved as expected.
