= Thaine's theorem =

Analogue of Stickelberger's theorem for real abelian fields

In mathematics, Thaine's theorem is an analogue of Stickelberger's theorem for real abelian fields, introduced by Francisco Thaine (1988). Thaine's method has been used to shorten the proof of the Mazur–Wiles theorem (Washington 1997), to prove that some Tate–Shafarevich groups are finite, and in the proof of Mihăilescu's theorem (Schoof 2008).

== Formulation ==
Let $p$ and $q$ be distinct odd primes with $q$ not dividing $p-1$. Let $G^+$ be the Galois group of $F=\mathbb Q(\zeta_p^+)$ over $\mathbb{Q}$, let $E$ be its group of units, let $C$ be the subgroup of cyclotomic units, and let $Cl^+$ be its class group. If $\theta\in\mathbb Z[G^+]$ annihilates $E/CE^q$ then it annihilates $Cl^+/Cl^{+q}$.
