= Sarvadaman Chowla =

Indian American mathematician (1907-1995)

- Born: 22 October 1907; London, England
- Died: 10 December 1995 (aged 88); Laramie, Wyoming, U.S.
- Education: Cambridge University; Government College, Lahore
- Scientific career
- Fields: Mathematics
- Workplaces: Institute for Advanced Study; University of Kansas; University of Colorado at Boulder; Penn State University; Government College, Lahore
- Doctoral advisor: John Edensor Littlewood
- Doctoral students: John Friedlander

Sarvadaman D. S. Chowla (22 October 1907 – 10 December 1995) was an English-American mathematician, specializing in number theory.

== Early life ==
He was born in London, since his father, Gopal Chowla, a professor of mathematics in Lahore, was then studying in Cambridge. His family returned to India, where he received his master's degree in 1928 from the Government College in Lahore. In 1931 he received his doctorate from the University of Cambridge, where he studied under J. E. Littlewood. He was born into a Punjabi Hindu Arora family.

== Career and awards ==
Chowla then returned to India, where he taught at several universities, becoming head of mathematics at Government College, Lahore in 1936. During the difficulties arising from the partition of India in 1947, he left for the United States. There he visited the Institute for Advanced Study until the fall of 1949, then taught at the University of Kansas in Lawrence until moving to the University of Colorado in 1952. He moved to Penn State in 1963 as a research professor, where he remained until his retirement in 1976. He was a member of the Indian National Science Academy.

Among his contributions are a number of results which bear his name. These include the Bruck–Ryser–Chowla theorem, the Ankeny–Artin–Chowla congruence, the Chowla–Mordell theorem, and the Chowla–Selberg formula, and the Mian–Chowla sequence.

He also posed Chowla's cosine problem, concerning how negative a sum of cosine functions with distinct positive integer frequencies must become, in terms of the number of terms.

== Works ==
- Chowla, Sarvadaman (2000). James G. Huard; Kenneth S. Williams (eds.). The Collected Papers of Sarvadaman Chowla. Montréal: Centre de Recherches mathématiques, Université de Montréal. OCLC 43730416.
- Chowla, S. (1965). Riemann Hypothesis and Hilbert's Tenth Problem. New York: Routledge. ISBN 978-0-677-00140-1. OCLC 15428640.
