= Gauss's lemma (number theory) =

Condition under which an integer is a quadratic residue

Gauss's lemma in number theory gives a condition for an integer to be a quadratic residue. Although it is not useful computationally, it has theoretical significance, being involved in some proofs of quadratic reciprocity.

It made its first appearance in Carl Friedrich Gauss's third proof (1808) of quadratic reciprocity and he proved it again in his fifth proof (1818).

== Statement of the lemma ==
For any odd prime p let a be an integer that is coprime to p.

Consider the integers

$$a, 2a, 3a, \dots, \frac{p-1}{2}a$$

and their least positive residues modulo p. These residues are all distinct, so there are (p − 1)/2 of them.

Let n be the number of these residues that are greater than p/2. Then

$$\left(\frac{a}{p}\right) = (-1)^n,$$

where $\left(\frac{a}{p}\right)$ is the Legendre symbol.

=== Example ===
Taking p = 11 and a = 7, the relevant sequence of integers is

7, 14, 21, 28, 35.

After reduction modulo 11, this sequence becomes

7, 3, 10, 6, 2.

Three of these integers are larger than 11/2 (namely 6, 7 and 10), so n = 3. Correspondingly Gauss's lemma predicts that

$$\left(\frac
{7}{11}\right) = (-1)^3 = -1.$$

This is indeed correct, because 7 is not a quadratic residue modulo 11.

The above sequence of residues

7, 3, 10, 6, 2

may also be written

−4, 3, −1, −5, 2.

In this form, the integers larger than 11/2 appear as negative numbers. It is also apparent that the absolute values of the residues are a permutation of the residues

1, 2, 3, 4, 5.

== Proof ==
A fairly simple proof, reminiscent of one of the simplest proofs of Fermat's little theorem, can be obtained by evaluating the product

$$Z = a \cdot 2a \cdot 3a \cdot \cdots \cdot \frac{p-1}2 a$$

modulo p in two different ways. On one hand it is equal to

$$Z = a^{(p-1)/2} \left(1 \cdot 2 \cdot 3 \cdot \cdots \cdot \frac{p-1}2 \right)$$

The second evaluation takes more work. If x is a nonzero residue modulo p, let us define the "absolute value" of x to be

$$|x| = \begin{cases} x & \mbox{if } 1 \leq x \leq \frac{p-1}2, \\ p-x & \mbox{if } \frac{p+1}2 \leq x \leq p-1. \end{cases}$$

Since n counts those multiples ka which are in the latter range, and since for those multiples, −ka is in the first range, we have

$$Z = (-1)^n \left(|a| \cdot |2a| \cdot |3a| \cdot \cdots \cdots \left|\frac{p-1}2 a\right|\right).$$

Now observe that the values |ra| are distinct for r = 1, 2, …, (p − 1)/2. Indeed, we have

$$\begin{align}
|ra| &\equiv |sa| &\pmod{p} \\
ra &\equiv \pm sa &\pmod{p} \\
r &\equiv \pm s &\pmod{p}
\end{align}$$

because a is coprime to p.

This gives r = s, since r and s are positive least residues. But there are exactly (p − 1)/2 of them, so their values are a rearrangement of the integers 1, 2, …, (p − 1)/2. Therefore,

$$Z = (-1)^n \left(1 \cdot 2 \cdot 3 \cdot \cdots \cdot \frac{p-1}2\right).$$

Comparing with our first evaluation, we may cancel out the nonzero factor

$$1 \cdot 2 \cdot 3 \cdot \cdots \cdot \frac{p-1}2$$

and we are left with

$$a^{(p-1)/2} = (-1)^n.$$

This is the desired result, because by Euler's criterion the left hand side is just an alternative expression for the Legendre symbol $\left (\frac{a}{p}\right )$.

== Generalization ==
For any odd prime p let a be an integer that is coprime to p.

Let $I \subset(\mathbb{Z} / p \mathbb{Z})^{\times}$ be a set such that $(\mathbb{Z} / p \mathbb{Z})^{\times}$ is the disjoint union of $I$ and $-I=\{-i: i \in I\}$.

Then $\left(\frac{a}{p}\right)=(-1)^t$, where $t=\#\{j \in I: a j \in-I\}$.

In the original statement, $I=\{1,2,\dots,\frac{p-1}2\}$.

The proof is almost the same.

== Applications ==
Gauss's lemma is used in many, but by no means all, of the known proofs of quadratic reciprocity.

For example, Gotthold Eisenstein used Gauss's lemma to prove that if p is an odd prime then

$$\left(\frac{a}{p}\right)=\prod_{n=1}^{(p-1)/2}\frac{\sin{(2\pi an/p)}}{\sin{(2\pi n/p)}},$$

and used this formula to prove quadratic reciprocity. By using elliptic rather than circular functions, he proved the cubic and quartic reciprocity laws.

Leopold Kronecker used the lemma to show that

$$\left(\frac{p}{q}\right)=\sgn\prod_{i=1}^{\frac{q-1}{2}}\prod_{k=1}^{\frac{p-1}{2}}\left(\frac{k}{p}-\frac{i}{q}\right).$$

Switching p and q immediately gives quadratic reciprocity.

It is also used in what are probably the simplest proofs of the "second supplementary law"

$$\left(\frac{2}{p}\right) = (-1)^{(p^2-1)/8} = \begin{cases} +1\text{ if }p\equiv \pm 1\pmod {8}\\-1\text{ if }p\equiv \pm 3\pmod {8}\end{cases}$$

== Higher powers ==
Generalizations of Gauss's lemma can be used to compute higher power residue symbols. In his second monograph on biquadratic reciprocity, Gauss used a fourth-power lemma to derive the formula for the biquadratic character of 1 + i in Z[i], the ring of Gaussian integers. Subsequently, Eisenstein used third- and fourth-power versions to prove cubic and quartic reciprocity.

=== nth power residue symbol ===
Let k be an algebraic number field with ring of integers $\mathcal{O}_k,$ and let $\mathfrak{p} \subset \mathcal{O}_k$ be a prime ideal. The ideal norm $\mathrm{N} \mathfrak{p}$ of $\mathfrak{p}$ is defined as the cardinality of the residue class ring. Since $\mathfrak{p}$ is prime this is a finite field $\mathcal{O}_k / \mathfrak{p}$, so the ideal norm is $\mathrm{N} \mathfrak{p} = |\mathcal{O}_k / \mathfrak{p}|$.

Assume that a primitive nth root of unity $\zeta_n\in\mathcal{O}_k,$ and that n and $\mathfrak{p}$ are coprime (i.e. $n\not\in \mathfrak{p}$). Then no two distinct nth roots of unity can be congruent modulo $\mathfrak{p}$.

This can be proved by contradiction, beginning by assuming that $\zeta_n^r\equiv\zeta_n^s$ mod $\mathfrak{p}$, 0 < r < s ≤ n. Let t = s − r such that $\zeta_n^t\equiv 1$ mod $\mathfrak{p}$, and 0 < t < n. From the definition of roots of unity,

$$x^n-1=(x-1)(x-\zeta_n)(x-\zeta_n^2)\dots(x-\zeta_n^{n-1}),$$

and dividing by x − 1 gives

$$x^{n-1}+x^{n-2}+\dots +x + 1 =(x-\zeta_n)(x-\zeta_n^2)\dots(x-\zeta_n^{n-1}).$$

Letting x = 1 and taking residues mod $\mathfrak{p}$,

$$n\equiv(1-\zeta_n)(1-\zeta_n^2)\dots(1-\zeta_n^{n-1})\pmod{\mathfrak{p}}.$$

Since n and $\mathfrak{p}$ are coprime, $n\not\equiv 0$ mod $\mathfrak{p},$ but under the assumption, one of the factors on the right must be zero. Therefore, the assumption that two distinct roots are congruent is false.

Thus the residue classes of $\mathcal{O}_k / \mathfrak{p}$ containing the powers of ζ_{n} are a subgroup of order n of its (multiplicative) group of units, $(\mathcal{O}_k/\mathfrak{p}) ^\times = \mathcal{O}_k /\mathfrak{p}- \{0\}.$ Therefore, the order of $(\mathcal{O}_k/\mathfrak{p})^ \times$ is a multiple of n, and

$$\begin{align}
\mathrm{N} \mathfrak{p} &= |\mathcal{O}_k / \mathfrak{p}| \\
&= \left |(\mathcal{O}_k / \mathfrak{p} )^\times \right| + 1 \\
&\equiv 1 \pmod{n}.
\end{align}$$

There is an analogue of Fermat's theorem in $\mathcal{O}_k$. If $\alpha \in \mathcal{O}_k$ for $\alpha\not\in \mathfrak{p}$, then

$$\alpha^{\mathrm{N} \mathfrak{p} -1}\equiv 1 \pmod{\mathfrak{p} },$$

and since $\mathrm{N} \mathfrak{p} \equiv 1$ mod n,

$$\alpha^{\frac{\mathrm{N} \mathfrak{p} -1}{n}}\equiv \zeta_n^s\pmod{\mathfrak{p} }$$

is well-defined and congruent to a unique nth root of unity ζ_{n}^{s}.

This root of unity is called the nth-power residue symbol for $\mathcal{O}_k,$ and is denoted by

$$\begin{align}
\left(\frac{\alpha}{\mathfrak{p} }\right)_n &= \zeta_n^s \\
&\equiv \alpha^{\frac{\mathrm{N} \mathfrak{p} -1}{n}}\pmod{\mathfrak{p}}.
\end{align}$$

It can be proven that

$$\left(\frac{\alpha}{\mathfrak{p} }\right)_n= 1$$

if and only if there is an $\eta \in\mathcal{O}_k$ such that α ≡ η^{n} mod $\mathfrak{p}$.

=== 1/n systems ===
Let $\mu_n = \{1,\zeta_n,\zeta_n^2,\dots,\zeta_n^{n-1}\}$ be the multiplicative group of the nth roots of unity, and let $A=\{a_1, a_2,\dots,a_m\}$ be representatives of the cosets of $(\mathcal{O}_k / \mathfrak{p})^\times/\mu_n.$ Then A is called a 1/n system mod $\mathfrak{p}.$

In other words, there are $mn=\mathrm{N} \mathfrak{p} -1$ numbers in the set $A\mu=\{ a_i \zeta_n^j\;:\; 1 \le i \le m, \;\;\;0 \le j \le n-1\},$ and this set constitutes a representative set for $(\mathcal{O}_k / \mathfrak{p})^\times.$

The numbers 1, 2, … (p − 1)/2, used in the original version of the lemma, are a 1/2 system (mod p).

Constructing a 1/n system is straightforward: let M be a representative set for $(\mathcal{O}_k / \mathfrak{p})^\times.$ Pick any $a_1\in M$ and remove the numbers congruent to $a_1, a_1\zeta_n, a_1\zeta_n^2, \dots, a_1\zeta_n^{n-1}$ from M. Pick a_{2} from M and remove the numbers congruent to $a_2, a_2\zeta_n, a_2\zeta_n^2, \dots, a_2\zeta_n^{n-1}$ Repeat until M is exhausted. Then {a_{1}, a_{2}, … a_{m}} is a 1/n system mod $\mathfrak{p}.$

=== The lemma for nth powers ===
Gauss's lemma may be extended to the nth power residue symbol as follows. Let $\zeta_n\in \mathcal{O}_k$ be a primitive nth root of unity, $\mathfrak{p} \subset \mathcal{O}_k$ a prime ideal, $\gamma \in \mathcal{O}_k, \;\;n\gamma\not\in\mathfrak{p},$ (i.e. $\mathfrak{p}$ is coprime to both γ and n) and let A = {a_{1}, a_{2}, …, a_{m}} be a 1/n system mod $\mathfrak{p}.$

Then for each i, 1 ≤ i ≤ m, there are integers π(i), unique (mod m), and b(i), unique (mod n), such that

$$\gamma a_i \equiv \zeta_n^{b(i)}a_{\pi(i)} \pmod{\mathfrak{p}},$$

and the nth-power residue symbol is given by the formula

$$\left(\frac{\gamma}{\mathfrak{p} }\right)_n = \zeta_n^{b(1)+b(2)+\dots+b(m)}.$$

The classical lemma for the quadratic Legendre symbol is the special case n = 2, ζ_{2} = −1, A = {1, 2, …, (p − 1)/2}, b(k) = 1 if ak > p/2, b(k) = 0 if ak < p/2.

==== Proof ====
The proof of the nth-power lemma uses the same ideas that were used in the proof of the quadratic lemma.

The existence of the integers π(i) and b(i), and their uniqueness (mod m) and (mod n), respectively, come from the fact that Aμ is a representative set.

Assume that π(i) = π(j) = p, i.e.

$$\gamma a_i \equiv \zeta_n^r a_p \pmod{\mathfrak{p}}$$

and

$$\gamma a_j \equiv \zeta_n^s a_p \pmod{\mathfrak{p}}.$$

Then

$$\zeta_n^{s-r}\gamma a_i \equiv \zeta_n^s a_p \equiv \gamma a_j\pmod{\mathfrak{p}}$$

Because γ and $\mathfrak{p}$ are coprime both sides can be divided by γ, giving

$$\zeta_n^{s-r} a_i \equiv a_j\pmod{\mathfrak{p}},$$

which, since A is a 1/n system, implies s = r and i = j, showing that π is a permutation of the set {1, 2, …, m}.

Then on the one hand, by the definition of the power residue symbol,

$$\begin{align}
(\gamma a_1)(\gamma a_2)\dots(\gamma a_m) &= \gamma^{\frac{\mathrm{N} \mathfrak{p} -1}{n}} a_1 a_2\dots a_m \\
&\equiv \left(\frac{\gamma}{\mathfrak{p} }\right)_n a_1 a_2\dots a_m \pmod{\mathfrak{p}},
\end{align}$$

and on the other hand, since π is a permutation,

$$\begin{align}
(\gamma a_1)(\gamma a_2)\dots(\gamma a_m)
&\equiv
{\zeta_n^{b(1)}a_{\pi(1)}} {\zeta_n^{b(2)}a_{\pi(2)}}\dots{\zeta_n^{b(m)}a_{\pi(m)}}
&\pmod{\mathfrak{p}}\\
&\equiv
\zeta_n^{b(1)+b(2)+\dots+b(m)}a_{\pi(1)} a_{\pi(2)}\dots a_{\pi(m)}
&\pmod{\mathfrak{p}}\\
&\equiv
\zeta_n^{b(1)+b(2)+\dots+b(m)} a_1 a_2\dots a_m
&\pmod{\mathfrak{p}},
\end{align}$$

so

$$\left(\frac{\gamma}{\mathfrak{p} }\right)_n a_1 a_2\dots a_m \equiv \zeta_n^{b(1)+b(2)+\dots+b(m)} a_1 a_2\dots a_m
\pmod{\mathfrak{p}},$$

and since for all 1 ≤ i ≤ m, a_{i} and $\mathfrak{p}$ are coprime, a_{1}a_{2}…a_{m} can be cancelled from both sides of the congruence,

$$\left(\frac{\gamma}{\mathfrak{p} }\right)_n \equiv \zeta_n^{b(1)+b(2)+\dots+b(m)}
\pmod{\mathfrak{p}},$$

and the theorem follows from the fact that no two distinct nth roots of unity can be congruent (mod $\mathfrak{p}$).

== Relation to the transfer in group theory ==
Let G be the multiplicative group of nonzero residue classes in Z/pZ, and let H be the subgroup {+1, −1}. Consider the following coset representatives of H in G,

$$1, 2, 3, \dots, \frac{p-1}{2}.$$

Applying the machinery of the transfer to this collection of coset representatives, we obtain the transfer homomorphism

$$\phi : G \to H,$$

which turns out to be the map that sends a to (−1)^{n}, where a and n are as in the statement of the lemma. Gauss's lemma may then be viewed as a computation that explicitly identifies this homomorphism as being the quadratic residue character.

== See also ==
- Zolotarev's lemma
