= Gauss sum =

Sum in algebraic number theory

In algebraic number theory, a Gauss sum or Gaussian sum is a particular kind of finite sum of roots of unity, typically

$$G(\chi) := G(\chi, \psi)= \sum \chi(r)\cdot \psi(r)$$

where the sum is over elements r of some finite commutative ring R, ψ is a group homomorphism of the additive group R^{+} into the unit circle, and χ is a group homomorphism of the unit group R^{×} into the unit circle, extended to non-unit r, where it takes the value 0. Gauss sums are the analogues for finite fields of the Gamma function.

Such sums are ubiquitous in number theory. They occur, for example, in the functional equations of Dirichlet L-functions, where for a Dirichlet character χ the equation relating L(s, χ) and L(1 − s, χ̅) (where χ̅ is the complex conjugate of χ) involves a factor

$$\frac{ G(\chi) }{ |G(\chi)| }.$$

== History ==
The case originally considered by Carl Friedrich Gauss was the quadratic Gauss sum, for R the field of residues modulo a prime number p, and χ the Legendre symbol. In this case Gauss proved that G(χ) = p^{1/2} or ip^{1/2} for p congruent to 1 or 3 modulo 4 respectively (the quadratic Gauss sum can also be evaluated by Fourier analysis as well as by contour integration).

An alternate form for this Gauss sum is

$$\sum e^{2 \pi i r^2/p}$$.

Quadratic Gauss sums are closely connected with the theory of theta functions.

The general theory of Gauss sums was developed in the early 19th century, with the use of Jacobi sums and their prime decomposition in cyclotomic fields. Gauss sums over a residue ring of integers mod N are linear combinations of closely related sums called Gaussian periods.

The absolute value of Gauss sums is usually found as an application of Plancherel's theorem on finite groups. In the case where R is a field of p elements and χ is nontrivial, the absolute value is p^{1/2}. The determination of the exact value of general Gauss sums, following the result of Gauss on the quadratic case, is a long-standing issue. For some cases see Kummer sum.

== Properties of Gauss sums of Dirichlet characters ==
The Gauss sum of a Dirichlet character modulo N is

$$G(\chi)=\sum_{a=1}^N\chi(a)e^{2\pi ia/N}.$$

If χ is also primitive, then

$$|G(\chi)|=\sqrt{N},$$

in particular, it is nonzero. More generally, if N_{0} is the conductor of χ and χ_{0} is the primitive Dirichlet character modulo N_{0} that induces χ, then the Gauss sum of χ is related to that of χ_{0} by

$$G(\chi)=\mu\left(\frac{N}{N_0}\right)\chi_0\left(\frac{N}{N_0}\right)G\left(\chi_0\right)$$

where μ is the Möbius function. Consequently, G(χ) is non-zero precisely when N/N_{0} is squarefree and relatively prime to N_{0}.

Other relations between G(χ) and Gauss sums of other characters include

$$G(\overline{\chi})=\chi(-1)\overline{G(\chi)},$$

where χ̅ is the complex conjugate Dirichlet character, and if χ′ is a Dirichlet character modulo N′ such that N and N′ are relatively prime, then

$$G\left(\chi\chi^\prime\right) = \chi\left(N^\prime\right) \chi^\prime(N) G(\chi) G\left(\chi^\prime\right).$$

The relation among G(χχ′), G(χ), and G(χ′) when χ and χ′ are of the same modulus (and χχ′ is primitive) is measured by the Jacobi sum J(χ, χ′). Specifically,

$$G\left(\chi\chi^\prime\right)=\frac{G(\chi)G\left(\chi^\prime\right)}{J\left(\chi,\chi^\prime\right)}.$$

== Further properties ==
- Gauss sums can be used to prove quadratic reciprocity, cubic reciprocity, and quartic reciprocity.
- Gauss sums can be used to calculate the number of solutions of polynomial equations over finite fields, and thus can be used to calculate certain zeta functions.

== See also ==
- Quadratic Gauss sum
- Elliptic Gauss sum
- Jacobi sum
- Kummer sum
- Kloosterman sum
- Gaussian period
- Hasse–Davenport relation
- Chowla–Mordell theorem
- Stickelberger's theorem
