= Gaussian period =

In mathematics, in the area of number theory, a Gaussian period is a certain kind of sum of roots of unity. The periods permit explicit calculations in cyclotomic fields connected with Galois theory and with harmonic analysis. See discrete Fourier transform. They are basic in the classical theory called cyclotomy. Closely related is the Gauss sum, a type of exponential sum which is a linear combination of periods.

== History ==
As the name suggests, the periods were introduced by Gauss and were the basis for his theory of compass and straightedge construction. For example, the construction of the heptadecagon (a formula that furthered his reputation) depended on the algebra of such periods, of which

$$2 \cos \left(\frac{2\pi}{17}\right) = \zeta + \zeta^{16} \,$$

is an example involving the seventeenth root of unity

$$\zeta = \exp \left(\frac{2\pi i}{17}\right).$$

== General definition ==
Given an integer n > 1, let H be any subgroup of the multiplicative group

$$G = (\mathbb{Z}/n\mathbb{Z})^\times$$

of invertible residues modulo n, and let

$$\zeta = \exp\left(\frac{2\pi i}{n}\right).$$

A Gaussian period P is a sum of the primitive n-th roots of unity $\zeta^a$, where $a$ runs through all of the elements in a fixed coset of H in G.

The definition of P can also be stated in terms of the field trace. We have

$$P = \operatorname{Tr}_{\mathbb{Q}(\zeta) / L} (\zeta^j)$$

for some subfield L of Q(ζ) and some j coprime to n. This corresponds to the previous definition by identifying G and H with the Galois groups of Q(ζ)/Q and Q(ζ)/L, respectively. The choice of j determines the choice of coset of H in G in the previous definition.

== Example ==
The situation is simplest when n is a prime number p > 2. In that case G is cyclic of order p − 1, and has one subgroup H of order d for every factor d of p − 1. For example, we can take H of index two. In that case H consists of the quadratic residues modulo p. Corresponding to this H we have the Gaussian period

$$P = \zeta + \zeta^4 + \zeta^9 + \cdots$$

summed over (p − 1)/2 quadratic residues, and the other period P* summed over the (p − 1)/2 quadratic non-residues. It is easy to see that

$$P + P^* = -1$$

since the left-hand side adds all the primitive p-th roots of 1. We also know, from the trace definition, that P lies in a quadratic extension of Q. Therefore, as Gauss knew, P satisfies a quadratic equation with integer coefficients. Evaluating the square of the sum P is connected with the problem of counting how many quadratic residues between 1 and p − 1 are succeeded by quadratic residues. The solution is elementary (as we would now say, it computes a local zeta-function, for a curve that is a conic). One has

(P − P*)^{2} = p or −p, for p = 4m + 1 or 4m + 3 respectively.

This therefore gives us the precise information about which quadratic field lies in Q(ζ). (That could be derived also by ramification arguments in algebraic number theory; see quadratic field.)

As Gauss eventually showed, to evaluate P − P*, the correct square root to take is the positive (resp. i times positive real) one, in the two cases. Thus the explicit value of the period P is given by

$$P = \begin{cases} \frac{-1+\sqrt{p}}{2}, & \text{if }p=4m+1, \\[6pt]
\frac{-1+i\sqrt{p}}{2}, & \text{if }p=4m+3. \end{cases}$$

== Gauss sums ==
As is discussed in more detail below, the Gaussian periods are closely related to another class of sums of roots of unity, now generally called Gauss sums (sometimes Gaussian sums). The quantity P − P* presented above is a quadratic Gauss sum mod p, the simplest non-trivial example of a Gauss sum. One observes that P − P* may also be written as

$$\sum \chi(a)\zeta^a$$

where $\chi(a)$ here stands for the Legendre symbol (a/p), and the sum is taken over residue classes modulo p. More generally, given a Dirichlet character χ mod n, the Gauss sum mod n associated with χ is

$$G(k,\chi) = \sum_{m=1}^n \chi(m) \exp\left(\frac{2\pi imk}{n}\right).$$

For the special case of $\chi=\chi_1$ the principal Dirichlet character, the Gauss sum reduces to the Ramanujan sum:

$$G(k,\chi_1) = c_n(k) =
\sum_{m=1; (m,n)=1}^n \exp\left(\frac{2\pi imk}{n}\right) =
\sum_{d|(n,k)} d\mu\left(\frac{n}{d}\right)$$

where μ is the Möbius function.

The Gauss sums $G(k, \chi)$ are ubiquitous in number theory; for example they occur significantly in the functional equations of L-functions. (Gauss sums are in a sense the finite field analogues of the gamma function.)

== Relationship of Gaussian periods and Gauss sums ==
The Gaussian periods are related to the Gauss sums $G(1,\chi)$ for which the character χ is trivial on H. Such χ take the same value at all elements a in a fixed coset of H in G. For example, the quadratic character mod p described above takes the value 1 at each quadratic residue, and takes the value -1 at each quadratic non-residue. The Gauss sum $G(1,\chi)$ can thus be written as a linear combination of Gaussian periods (with coefficients χ(a)); the converse is also true, as a consequence of the orthogonality relations for the group (Z/nZ)^{×}. In other words, the Gaussian periods and Gauss sums are each other's Fourier transforms. The Gaussian periods generally lie in smaller fields, since for example when n is a prime p, the values χ(a) are (p − 1)-th roots of unity. On the other hand, Gauss sums have nicer algebraic properties.
