= Zolotarev's lemma =

Ties Legendre symbols to permutation signatures

In number theory, Zolotarev's lemma states that the Legendre symbol

$$\left(\frac{a}{p}\right)$$

for an integer a modulo an odd prime number p, where p does not divide a, can be computed as the sign of a permutation:

$$\left(\frac{a}{p}\right) = \varepsilon(\pi_a)$$

where ε denotes the signature of a permutation and π_{a} is the permutation of the nonzero residue classes mod p induced by multiplication by a.

For example, take a = 2 and p = 7. The nonzero squares mod 7 are 1, 2, and 4, so (2|7) = 1 and (6|7) = −1. Multiplication by 2 on the nonzero numbers mod 7 has the cycle decomposition (1,2,4)(3,6,5), so the sign of this permutation is 1, which is (2|7). Multiplication by 6 on the nonzero numbers mod 7 has cycle decomposition (1,6)(2,5)(3,4), whose sign is −1, which is (6|7).

== Proof ==
In general, for any finite group G of order n, it is straightforward to determine the signature of the permutation π_{g} made by left-multiplication by the element g of G. Considering the group action of the subgroup generated by g (<g>) on G by π_{g}, this permutation will be even unless there are an odd number of orbits of even size. Note that each orbit must have length equal to the order of <g>. Assuming n even, therefore, the condition for π_{g} to be an odd permutation, when g has order k, is that n/k should be odd, or that the subgroup <g> generated by g should have odd index.

We will apply this to the group of nonzero numbers mod p, which is a cyclic group of order p − 1. The jth power of a primitive root modulo p will have index the greatest common divisor

i = (j, p − 1).

The condition for a nonzero number mod p to be a quadratic non-residue is to be an odd power of a primitive root. The lemma therefore comes down to saying that i is odd when j is odd, which is true a fortiori, and j is odd when i is odd, which is true because p − 1 is even (p is odd).

== Another proof ==
Zolotarev's lemma can be deduced easily from Gauss's lemma and vice versa. The example

$$\left(\frac{3}{11}\right)$$,

i.e. the Legendre symbol (a/p) with a = 3 and p = 11, will illustrate how the proof goes. Start with the set {1, 2, . . . , p − 1} arranged as a matrix of two rows such that the sum of the two elements in any column is zero mod p, say:

1	2	3	4	5
10	9	8	7	6

Apply the permutation $U: x\mapsto ax\pmod p$:

3	6	9	1	4
8	5	2	10	7

The columns still have the property that the sum of two elements in one column is zero mod p. Now apply a permutation V which swaps any pairs in which the upper member was originally a lower member:

3	5	2	1	4
8	6	9	10	7

Finally, apply a permutation W which gets back the original matrix:

1	2	3	4	5
10	9	8	7	6

We have W^{−1} = VU. Zolotarev's lemma says (a/p) = 1 if and only if the permutation U is even. Gauss's lemma says (a/p) = 1 iff V is even. But W is even, so the two lemmas are equivalent for the given (but arbitrary) a and p.

== Jacobi symbol ==
This interpretation of the Legendre symbol as the sign of a permutation can be extended to the Jacobi symbol

$$\left(\frac{a}{n}\right),$$

where a and n are relatively prime integers with odd n > 0: a is invertible mod n, so multiplication by a on Z/nZ is a permutation and a generalization of Zolotarev's lemma is that the Jacobi symbol above is the sign of this permutation.

For example, multiplication by 2 on Z/21Z has cycle decomposition (0)(1,2,4,8,16,11)(3,6,12)(5,10,20,19,17,13)(7,14)(9,18,15), so the sign of this permutation is (1)(−1)(1)(−1)(−1)(1) = −1 and the Jacobi symbol (2|21) is −1. (Note that multiplication by 2 on the units mod 21 is a product of two 6-cycles, so its sign is 1. Thus it's important to use all integers mod n and not just the units mod n to define the right permutation.)

When n = p is an odd prime and a is not divisible by p, multiplication by a fixes 0 mod p, so the sign of multiplication by a on all numbers mod p and on the units mod p have the same sign. But for composite n that is not the case, as we see in the example above.

== History ==
This lemma was introduced by Yegor Ivanovich Zolotarev in an 1872 proof of quadratic reciprocity.
