= Landsberg–Schaar relation =

Theorem

In number theory and harmonic analysis, the Landsberg–Schaar relation (or identity) is the following equation, which is valid for arbitrary positive integers p and q:

$$\frac{1}{\sqrt{p}}\sum_{n=0}^{p-1}\exp\left(\frac{2\pi in^2q}{p}\right)=
\frac{e^{\frac14\pi i}}{\sqrt{2q}}\sum_{n=0}^{2q-1}\exp\left(-\frac{\pi in^2p}{2q}\right).$$

The standard way to prove it is to put τ = 2iq/p + ε, where ε > 0 in this identity due to Jacobi (which is essentially just a special case of the Poisson summation formula in classical harmonic analysis):

$$\sum_{n=-\infty}^{+\infty}e^{-\pi n^2\tau}=\frac{1}{\sqrt{\tau}}
\sum_{n=-\infty}^{+\infty}e^{-\pi \frac{n^2}{\tau}}$$

and then let ε → 0.

A proof using only finite methods was discovered in 2018 by Ben Moore.

If we let q = 1, the identity reduces to a formula for the quadratic Gauss sum modulo p.

The Landsberg–Schaar identity can be rephrased more symmetrically as

$$\frac{1}{\sqrt{p}}\sum_{n=0}^{p-1}\exp\left(\frac{\pi in^2q}{p}\right)=
\frac{e^{\frac14\pi i}}{\sqrt{q}}\sum_{n=0}^{q-1}\exp\left(-\frac{\pi in^2p}{q}\right)$$

provided that we add the hypothesis that pq is an even number.
