= Fermat curve =

Algebraic curve

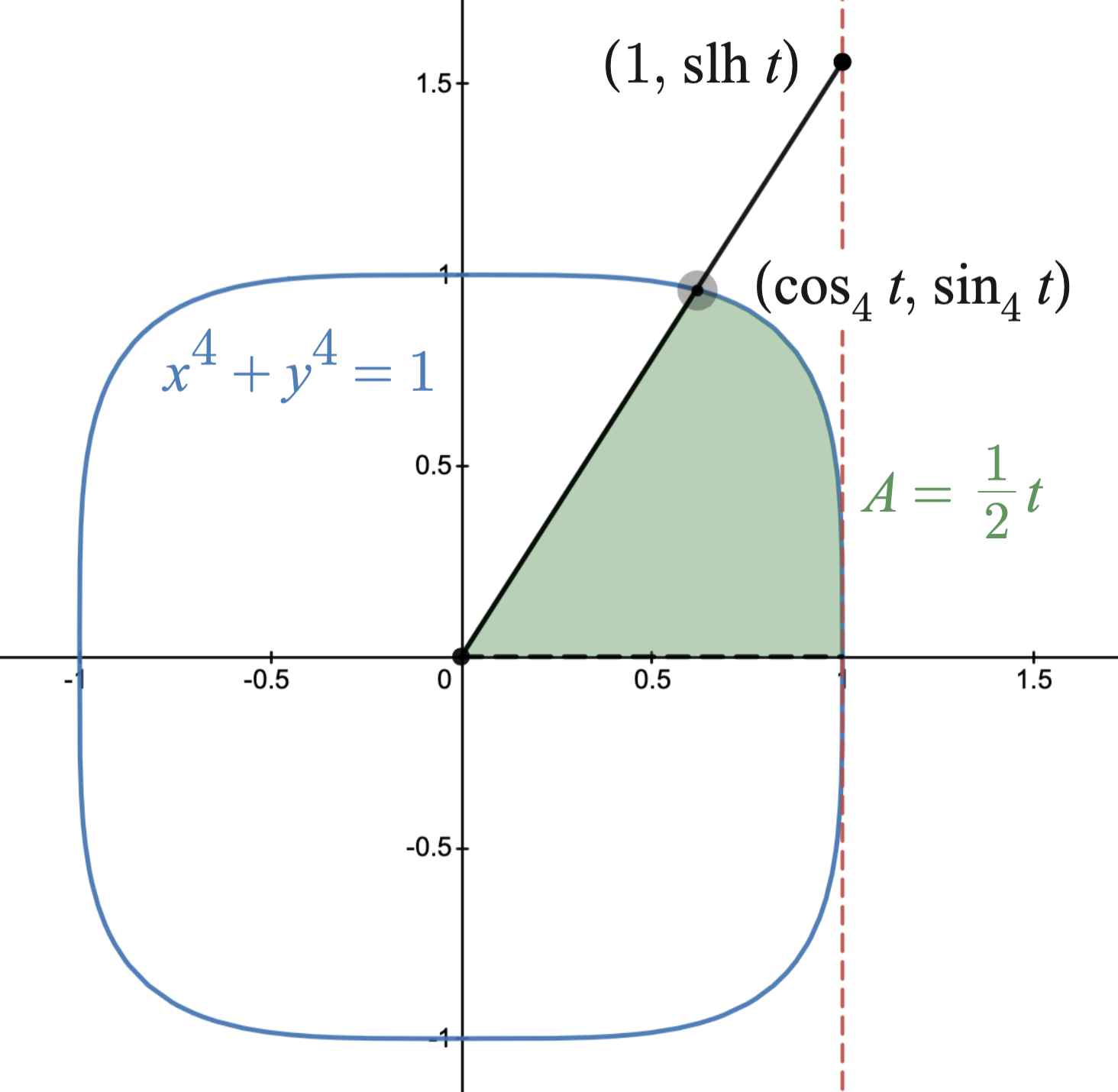
With respect to the quartic Fermat curve $x^4 + y^4 = 1$, the hyperbolic lemniscate sine is analogous to the trigonometric tangent function. Unlike $\operatorname{slh}$ and $\operatorname{clh}$, the functions $\sin_4$ and $\cos_4$ cannot be analytically extended to meromorphic functions in the whole complex plane.

In mathematics, the Fermat curve is the algebraic curve in the complex projective plane defined in homogeneous coordinates (X:Y:Z) by the Fermat equation:

$$X^n + Y^n = Z^n.\$$

Therefore, in terms of the affine plane its equation is:

$$x^n + y^n = 1.\$$

An integer solution to the Fermat equation would correspond to a nonzero rational number solution to the affine equation, and vice versa. But by Fermat's Last Theorem it is now known that (for n > 2) there are no nontrivial integer solutions to the Fermat equation; therefore, the Fermat curve has no nontrivial rational points.

The Fermat curve is non-singular and has genus:

$$(n - 1)(n - 2)/2.\$$

This means genus 0 for the case n = 2 (a conic) and genus 1 only for n = 3 (an elliptic curve). The Jacobian variety of the Fermat curve has been studied in depth. It is isogenous to a product of simple abelian varieties with complex multiplication.

The Fermat curve also has gonality:

$$n-1.\$$

== Fermat varieties ==
Fermat-style equations in more variables define as projective varieties the Fermat varieties.

== Related studies ==
- Baker, Matthew; Gonzalez-Jimenez, Enrique; Gonzalez, Josep; Poonen, Bjorn (2005), "Finiteness results for modular curves of genus at least 2", American Journal of Mathematics, 127 (6): 1325–1387, arXiv:math/0211394, doi:10.1353/ajm.2005.0037, JSTOR 40068023, S2CID 8578601
- Gross, Benedict H.; Rohrlich, David E. (1978), "Some Results on the Mordell-Weil Group of the Jacobian of the Fermat Curve" (PDF), Inventiones Mathematicae, 44 (3): 201–224, Bibcode:1978InMat..44..201G, doi:10.1007/BF01403161, S2CID 121819622, archived from the original (PDF) on 2011-07-13
- Klassen, Matthew J.; Debarre, Olivier (1994), "Points of Low Degree on Smooth Plane Curves", Journal für die reine und angewandte Mathematik, 1994 (446): 81–88, arXiv:alg-geom/9210004, doi:10.1515/crll.1994.446.81, S2CID 7967465
- Tzermias, Pavlos (2004), "Low-Degree Points on Hurwitz-Klein Curves", Transactions of the American Mathematical Society, 356 (3): 939–951, doi:10.1090/S0002-9947-03-03454-8, JSTOR 1195002
