= Cyclotomic field =

Field extension of the rational numbers by a primitive root of unity

In algebraic number theory, a cyclotomic field is a number field obtained by adjoining a complex root of unity to $\Q$, the field of rational numbers.

Cyclotomic fields played a crucial role in the development of modern algebra and number theory because of their relation with Fermat's Last Theorem. It was in the process of his deep investigations of the arithmetic of these fields (for prime $n$)—and more precisely, because of the failure of unique factorization in their rings of integers—that Ernst Kummer first introduced the concept of an ideal number and proved his celebrated congruences.

== Definition ==
For $n \geq 1$, let

$$\zeta_n=e^{2\pi i/n}\in\C.$$

This is a primitive $n$th root of unity. Then the $n$th cyclotomic field is the field extension $\mathbb{Q}(\zeta_n)$ of $\mathbb{Q}$ generated by $\zeta_n$.

== Properties ==
- The $n$th cyclotomic polynomial
  $$\Phi_n(x) =
\prod_\stackrel{1\le k\le n}{\gcd(k,n)=1}\!\!\!
\left(x-e^{2\pi i k/n}\right)
=
\prod_\stackrel{1\le k\le n}{\gcd(k,n)=1}\!\!\!
(x-{\zeta_n}^k)$$
  is irreducible, so it is the minimal polynomial of $\zeta_n$ over $\Q$.
- The conjugates of $\zeta_n$ in $\C$ are therefore the other primitive $n$-th roots of unity: $\zeta_n^k$ for $1\leq k\leq n$ with $\gcd(k,n)=1$.
- The degree of $\Q(\zeta_n)$ is therefore $[\Q(\zeta_n):\Q]=\deg\Phi_n=\varphi(n)$, where $\varphi$ is Euler's totient function.
- The roots of $x^n-1$ are the powers of $\zeta_n$, so $\Q(\zeta_n)$ is the splitting field of $x^n-1$ (or of $\Phi_n$) over $\Q$. It follows that $\Q(\zeta_n)$ is a Galois extension of $\mathbb{Q}$.
- The Galois group $\operatorname{Gal}(\Q(\zeta_n)/\Q)$ is naturally isomorphic to the multiplicative group $(\Z/n\Z)^\times$, which consists of the invertible residues modulo $n$, which are the residues $a$ mod $n$ with $1\leq a \leq n$ and $\gcd(a,n)=1$. The isomorphism sends each $\sigma \in \operatorname{Gal}(\Q(\zeta_n)/\Q)$ to $a$ mod $n$, where $a$ is an integer such that $\sigma(\zeta_n)=\zeta_n^a$.
- The ring of integers of $\Q(\zeta_n)$ is $\Z[\zeta_n]$.
- For $n>2$, the discriminant of the extension $\Q(\zeta_n)/\Q$ is(Proposition 2.7)

$$(-1)^{\varphi(n)/2}\,
\frac{n^{\varphi(n)}}
{\displaystyle\prod_{p|n} p^{\varphi(n)/(p-1)}}.$$

- In particular, $\Q(\zeta_n)/\Q$ is unramified above every prime not dividing $n$.
- If $n$ is a power of a prime $p$, then $\Q(\zeta_n)/\Q$ is totally ramified above $p$.
- If $q$ is a prime not dividing $n$, then the Frobenius element $\operatorname{Frob}_q \in \operatorname{Gal}(\Q(\zeta_n)/\Q)$ corresponds to the residue of $q$ in $(\Z/n\Z)^\times$.
- The group of roots of unity in $\Q(\zeta_n)$ has order $n$ or $2n$, according to whether $n$ is even or odd.
- The unit group $\Z[\zeta_n]^\times$ is a finitely generated abelian group of rank $\varphi(n)/2-1$, for any $n>2$, by the Dirichlet unit theorem. In particular, $\Z[\zeta_n]^\times$ is finite only for $n\in\{1,2,3,4,6\}$. The torsion subgroup of $\Z[\zeta_n]^\times$ is the group of roots of unity in $\Q(\zeta_n)$, which was described in the previous item. Cyclotomic units form an explicit finite-index subgroup of $\Z[\zeta_n]^\times$.
- The Kronecker–Weber theorem states that every finite abelian extension of $\Q$ in $\C$ is contained in $\Q(\zeta_n)$ for some $n$. Equivalently, the union of all the cyclotomic fields $\Q(\zeta_n)$ is the maximal abelian extension $\Q^{\mathrm{ab}}$ of $\Q$.

== Relation with regular polygons ==
Gauss made early inroads in the theory of cyclotomic fields, in connection with the problem of constructing a regular n-gon with a compass and straightedge. His surprising result that had escaped his predecessors was that a regular 17-gon could be so constructed. More generally, for any integer $n\geq 3$, the following are equivalent:

- a regular $n$-gon is constructible;
- there is a sequence of fields, starting with $\Q$ and ending with $\Q(\zeta_n)$, such that each is a quadratic extension of the previous field;
- $\varphi(n)$ is a power of 2;
- $n=2^a p_1 \cdots p_r$ for some integers $a, r\geq 0$ and Fermat primes $p_1,\ldots,p_r$. (A Fermat prime is an odd prime $p$ such that $p-1$ is a power of 2. The known Fermat primes are 3, 5, 17, 257, 65537, and it is likely that there are no others.)

=== Small examples ===
- $n=3$ and $n=6$: The equations $\zeta_3 = \tfrac{1}{2}(-1+\sqrt{-3}\,)$ and $\zeta_6 = \tfrac{1}{2}( 1+\sqrt{-3} \,)$ show that $\mathbb{Q}(\zeta_3) = \mathbb{Q}(\zeta_6)=\mathbb{Q}(\sqrt{-3})$, which is a quadratic extension of $\mathbb{Q}$. Correspondingly, a regular 3-gon and a regular 6-gon are constructible.
- $n=4$: Similarly, ζ_{4} = i, so $\mathbb{Q}(\zeta_4)$, and a regular 4-gon is constructible.
- $n=5$: The field $\mathbb{Q}(\zeta_5)$ is not a quadratic extension of $\mathbb{Q}$, but it is a quadratic extension of the quadratic extension $\mathbb{Q}(\sqrt{5})$, so a regular 5-gon is constructible.

== Relation with Fermat's Last Theorem ==
A natural approach to proving Fermat's Last Theorem is to factor the binomial $x^n + y^n$, where $n$ is an odd prime, appearing in one side of Fermat's equation

$$x^n + y^n = z^n$$

as follows:

$$x^n + y^n = (x + y)(x + \zeta_n y)\ldots (x + \zeta_n^{n-1} y)$$

Here $x$ and $y$ are ordinary integers, whereas the factors are algebraic integers in the cyclotomic field $\Q(\zeta_n)$. If unique factorization holds in the cyclotomic integers $\Z[\zeta_n]$, then it can be used to rule out the existence of nontrivial solutions to Fermat's equation.

Several attempts to tackle Fermat's Last Theorem proceeded along these lines, and both Fermat's proof for $n=4$ and Euler's proof for $n=3$ can be recast in these terms. The complete list of n for which $\Z[\zeta_n]$ has unique factorization is (Theorem 11.1)

- 1 through 22, 24, 25, 26, 27, 28, 30, 32, 33, 34, 35, 36, 38, 40, 42, 44, 45, 48, 50, 54, 60, 66, 70, 84, 90.

Kummer found a way to deal with the failure of unique factorization. He introduced a replacement for the prime numbers in the cyclotomic integers $\Z[\zeta_n]$, measured the failure of unique factorization via the class number $h_n$ and proved that if $h_p$ is not divisible by a prime $p$ (such $p$ are called regular primes) then Fermat's theorem is true for the exponent $n=p$. Furthermore, he gave a criterion to determine which primes are regular, and established Fermat's theorem for all prime exponents $p$ less than 100, except for the irregular primes 37, 59, and 67. Kummer's work on the congruences for the class numbers of cyclotomic fields was generalized in the twentieth century by Iwasawa in Iwasawa theory and by Kubota and Leopoldt in their theory of $p$-adic zeta functions.

== List of class numbers of cyclotomic fields ==
(sequence A061653 in the OEIS), or (sequence A055513 in the OEIS) or (sequence A000927 in the OEIS) for the $h$-part (for prime n)

- 1-22: 1
- 23: 3
- 24-28: 1
- 29: 8
- 30: 1
- 31: 9
- 32-36: 1
- 37: 37
- 38: 1
- 39: 2
- 40: 1
- 41: 121
- 42: 1
- 43: 211
- 44: 1
- 45: 1
- 46: 3
- 47: 695
- 48: 1
- 49: 43
- 50: 1
- 51: 5
- 52: 3
- 53: 4889
- 54: 1
- 55: 10
- 56: 2
- 57: 9
- 58: 8
- 59: 41241
- 60: 1
- 61: 76301
- 62: 9
- 63: 7
- 64: 17
- 65: 64
- 66: 1
- 67: 853513
- 68: 8
- 69: 69
- 70: 1
- 71: 3882809
- 72: 3
- 73: 11957417
- 74: 37
- 75: 11
- 76: 19
- 77: 1280
- 78: 2
- 79: 100146415
- 80: 5
- 81: 2593
- 82: 121
- 83: 838216959
- 84: 1
- 85: 6205
- 86: 211
- 87: 1536
- 88: 55
- 89: 13379363737
- 90: 1
- 91: 53872
- 92: 201
- 93: 6795
- 94: 695
- 95: 107692
- 96: 9
- 97: 411322824001
- 98: 43
- 99: 2883
- 100: 55
- 101: 3547404378125
- 102: 5
- 103: 9069094643165
- 104: 351
- 105: 13
- 106: 4889
- 107: 63434933542623
- 108: 19
- 109: 161784800122409
- 110: 10
- 111: 480852
- 112: 468
- 113: 1612072001362952
- 114: 9
- 115: 44697909
- 116: 10752
- 117: 132678
- 118: 41241
- 119: 1238459625
- 120: 4
- 121: 12188792628211
- 122: 76301
- 123: 8425472
- 124: 45756
- 125: 57708445601
- 126: 7
- 127: 2604529186263992195
- 128: 359057
- 129: 37821539
- 130: 64
- 131: 28496379729272136525
- 132: 11
- 133: 157577452812
- 134: 853513
- 135: 75961
- 136: 111744
- 137: 646901570175200968153
- 138: 69
- 139: 1753848916484925681747
- 140: 39
- 141: 1257700495
- 142: 3882809
- 143: 36027143124175
- 144: 507
- 145: 1467250393088
- 146: 11957417
- 147: 5874617
- 148: 4827501
- 149: 687887859687174720123201
- 150: 11
- 151: 2333546653547742584439257
- 152: 1666737
- 153: 2416282880
- 154: 1280
- 155: 84473643916800
- 156: 156
- 157: 56234327700401832767069245
- 158: 100146415
- 159: 223233182255
- 160: 31365

== See also ==
- Kronecker–Weber theorem
- Cyclotomic polynomial
