= Legendre symbol =

Function in number theory

Legendre symbol (a/p) for various a (along top) and p (along left side).
a p	0	1	2	3	4	5	6	7	8	9	10	11	12
3	0	1	−1										
5	0	1	−1	−1	1								
7	0	1	1	−1	1	−1	−1						
11	0	1	−1	1	1	1	−1	−1	−1	1	−1		
13	0	1	−1	1	1	−1	−1	−1	−1	1	1	−1	1
Only 0 ≤ a < p are shown, since due to the first property below any other a can be reduced modulo p. Quadratic residues are highlighted in yellow, and correspond precisely to the values 0 and 1.

In number theory, the Legendre symbol is a function of $a$ and $p$ defined as
$$\left(\frac{a}{p}\right) =
\begin{cases}
1 & \text{if } a \text{ is a quadratic residue modulo } p \text{ and } a \not\equiv 0\pmod p, \\
-1 & \text{if } a \text{ is a quadratic nonresidue modulo } p, \\
0 & \text{if } a \equiv 0 \pmod p.
\end{cases}$$
where $p$ is an odd prime number and $a$ is a positive integer that may or may not be a quadratic residue mod p. The Legendre symbol is a multiplicative function.

The Legendre symbol was introduced by Adrien-Marie Legendre in 1797 or 1798 in the course of his attempts at proving the law of quadratic reciprocity. Generalizations of the symbol include the Jacobi symbol and Dirichlet characters of higher order. The notational convenience of the Legendre symbol inspired introduction of several other "symbols" used in algebraic number theory, such as the Hilbert symbol and the Artin symbol.

== Definition ==
Legendre's original definition was by means of the explicit formula
$$\left(\frac{a}{p}\right) \equiv a^{\frac{p-1}{2}} \pmod p \quad \text{ and } \quad\left(\frac{a}{p}\right) \in \{-1,0,1\}.$$

By Euler's criterion, which had been discovered earlier and was known to Legendre, these two definitions are equivalent. Thus Legendre's contribution lay in introducing a convenient notation that recorded whether a is a residue or a non-residue modulo p. Gauss' original notation used aRp for $(\tfrac{a}{p})=1$ and aNp for $(\tfrac{a}{p})=-1$. For typographical convenience, the Legendre symbol is sometimes written as (a | p) or (a/p). For fixed p, the sequence $(\tfrac{0}{p}),(\tfrac{1}{p}),(\tfrac{2}{p}),\ldots$ is periodic with period p and is sometimes called the Legendre sequence (see above table).

== Properties of the Legendre symbol ==
There are a number of useful properties of the Legendre symbol which, together with the law of quadratic reciprocity, can be used to compute it efficiently.

- Given a generator $g \in \mathbb{F}_p^*$, if $x = g^r$, then $x$ is a quadratic residue if and only if $r$ is even. This shows that half of the elements in $\mathbb{F}_p^*$ are quadratic residues.
- If $p \equiv 3 \text{ mod } 4$ then the fact that
  $$\frac{p+1}{4} + \frac{p+1}{4} = \frac{p+1}2 = \frac{(p-1)+2}{2} = \frac{p-1}2 + 1$$
  gives us that $a = x^{(p+1)/4}$ is a square root of the quadratic residue $x$.
- The Legendre symbol is periodic in its first (or top) argument: if a ≡ b (mod p), then
  $$\left(\frac{a}{p}\right) = \left(\frac{b}{p}\right).$$
- The Legendre symbol is a completely multiplicative function of its top argument:
  $$\left(\frac{ab}{p}\right) = \left(\frac{a}{p}\right)\left(\frac{b}{p}\right).$$
- In particular, the product of two numbers that are both quadratic residues or quadratic non-residues modulo p is a residue, whereas the product of a residue with a non-residue is a non-residue. A special case is the Legendre symbol of a square:
  $$\left(\frac{x^2}{p}\right) = \begin{cases} 1 & \mbox{if }p\nmid x\\ 0 & \mbox{if }p\mid x. \end{cases}$$
- When viewed as a function of a, the Legendre symbol $\left(\frac{a}{p}\right)$ is the unique quadratic (or order 2) Dirichlet character modulo p.
- The first supplement to the law of quadratic reciprocity:
  $$\left(\frac{-1}{p}\right)  = (-1)^{\frac{p-1}{2}} =
\begin{cases}
1 & \mbox{ if }p \equiv 1\pmod{4} \\
-1 & \mbox{ if }p \equiv 3\pmod{4}.
\end{cases}$$
- The second supplement to the law of quadratic reciprocity:
  $$\left(\frac{2}{p}\right) = (-1)^\tfrac{p^2-1}{8} =
\begin{cases}
1 & \mbox{ if }p \equiv 1\mbox{ or }7 \pmod{8} \\
-1 & \mbox{ if }p \equiv 3\mbox{ or }5 \pmod{8}.
\end{cases}$$
- Special formulas for the Legendre symbol $\left(\frac{a}{p}\right)$ for small values of a:
  - For an odd prime p ≠ 3,
    $$\left(\frac{3}{p}\right) = (-1)^{\big\lfloor \frac{p+1}{6}\big\rfloor} =
\begin{cases}
1 & \mbox{ if }p \equiv 1\mbox{ or }11 \pmod{12} \\
-1 & \mbox{ if }p \equiv 5\mbox{ or }7 \pmod{12}.
\end{cases}$$
  - For an odd prime p ≠ 5,
    $$\left(\frac{5}{p}\right) =(-1)^{\big\lfloor \frac{2p+2}{5}\big \rfloor} =
\begin{cases}
1 & \mbox{ if }p \equiv 1\mbox{ or }4 \pmod5 \\
-1 & \mbox{ if }p \equiv 2\mbox{ or }3 \pmod5.
\end{cases}$$
- The Fibonacci numbers 1, 1, 2, 3, 5, 8, 13, 21, 34, 55, ... are defined by the recurrence F_{1} = F_{2} = 1, F_{n+1} = F_{n} + F_{n−1}. If p is a prime number then
  $$F_{p-\left(\frac{p}{5}\right)} \equiv 0 \pmod p, \qquad F_{p} \equiv \left(\frac{p}{5}\right) \pmod p.$$
  For example,
  $$\begin{align}
\left(\tfrac{2}{5}\right)  &= -1, &    F_3 &= 2,  &    F_2 &= 1,  \\
\left(\tfrac{3}{5}\right)  &= -1, &    F_4 &= 3,  &    F_3 &= 2,  \\
\left(\tfrac{5}{5}\right)  &=  0, &    F_5 &= 5,  &        &      \\
\left(\tfrac{7}{5}\right)  &= -1, &    F_8 &= 21, &    F_7 &= 13, \\
\left(\tfrac{11}{5}\right) &=  1, & F_{10} &= 55, & F_{11} &= 89.
\end{align}$$
- This result comes from the theory of Lucas sequences, which are used in primality testing. See Wall–Sun–Sun prime.

== Sums of Legendre symbols ==
Sums of the form $\sum \left(\frac{f\left(a \right) }{p}\right)$, typically taken over all integers in the range $\left[0,p-1\right]$ for some function $f$, are a special case of character sums. They are of interest in the distribution of quadratic residues modulo a prime number.

== Legendre symbol and quadratic reciprocity ==
Let p and q be distinct odd primes. Using the Legendre symbol, the quadratic reciprocity law can be stated concisely:
$$\left(\frac{q}{p}\right)\left(\frac{p}{q}\right) = (-1)^{\tfrac{p-1}{2}\cdot\tfrac{q-1}{2}} = \begin{cases}
+1 & \mbox{ if }p \equiv 1 \mbox{ or }q \equiv 1 \pmod{4}, \\
-1 & \mbox{ if }p \equiv 3 \mbox{ and }q \equiv 3 \pmod{4}.
\end{cases}$$

Many proofs of quadratic reciprocity are based on Euler's criterion
$$\left(\frac{a}{p}\right) \equiv a^{\tfrac{p-1}{2}} \pmod p.$$

In addition, several alternative expressions for the Legendre symbol were devised in order to produce various proofs of the quadratic reciprocity law.

- Gauss introduced the quadratic Gauss sum and used the formula
  $$\sum_{k=0}^{p-1}\zeta^{ak^2}=\left(\frac{a}{p}\right)\sum_{k=0}^{p-1}\zeta^{k^2},\qquad \zeta = e^{\frac{2\pi i}{p}}$$
  in his fourth and sixth proofs of quadratic reciprocity.
- Kronecker's proof first establishes that
  $$\left(\frac{p}{q}\right) =\sgn\left(\prod_{i=1}^{\frac{q-1}{2}}\prod_{k=1}^{\frac{p-1}{2}}\left(\frac{k}{p}-\frac{i}{q}\right)\right).$$
  Reversing the roles of p and q, he obtains the relation between (p/q) and (q/p).
- One of Eisenstein's proofs begins by showing that
  $$\left(\frac{q}{p}\right) =\prod_{n=1}^{\frac{p-1}{2}} \frac{\sin\left(\frac{2\pi qn}{p}\right)}{\sin\left(\frac{2\pi n}{p}\right)}.$$
  Using certain elliptic functions instead of the sine function, Eisenstein was able to prove cubic and quartic reciprocity as well.

== Related functions ==
- The Jacobi symbol $\left(\frac{a}{n}\right)$ is a generalization of the Legendre symbol that allows for a composite second (bottom) argument n, although n must still be odd and positive. This generalization provides an efficient way to compute all Legendre symbols without performing factorization along the way.
- A further extension is the Kronecker symbol, in which the bottom argument may be any integer.
- The power residue symbol (a/n)_{n} generalizes the Legendre symbol to higher power n. The Legendre symbol represents the power residue symbol for n = 2.

== Computational example ==
The above properties, including the law of quadratic reciprocity, can be used to evaluate any Legendre symbol. For example:
$$\begin{align}
\left ( \frac{12345}{331}\right )&=\left ( \frac{3}{331}\right ) \left ( \frac{5}{331}\right ) \left ( \frac{823}{331}\right ) \\
&= \left ( \frac{3}{331}\right ) \left ( \frac{5}{331}\right ) \left ( \frac{161}{331}\right ) \\
&= \left ( \frac{3}{331}\right ) \left ( \frac{5}{331}\right ) \left ( \frac{7}{331}\right ) \left ( \frac{23}{331}\right ) \\
&= (-1)\left (\frac{331}{3}\right) \left(\frac{331}{5}\right) (-1) \left(\frac{331}{7}\right) (-1)\left (\frac{331}{23}\right ) \\
&= -\left ( \frac{1}{3}\right ) \left ( \frac{1}{5}\right ) \left ( \frac{2}{7}\right ) \left ( \frac{9}{23}\right )\\
&= -\left ( \frac{1}{3}\right ) \left ( \frac{1}{5}\right ) \left ( \frac{2}{7}\right ) \left ( \frac{3^2}{23}\right )\\
&= -(1) (1) (1) (1) \\
&= -1.
\end{align}$$

Or using a more efficient computation:
$$\left ( \frac{12345}{331}\right )=\left ( \frac{98}{331}\right )=\left ( \frac{2 \cdot 7^2}{331}\right )=\left ( \frac{2}{331}\right )=(-1)^\tfrac{331^2-1}{8}=-1.$$
The article Jacobi symbol has more examples of Legendre symbol manipulation.

Since no efficient factorization algorithm is known, but efficient modular exponentiation algorithms are, in general it is more efficient to use Legendre's original definition, e.g.
$$\begin{align}
\left(\frac{98}{331}\right) &\equiv 98^{\frac{331-1}{2}} &\pmod{331} \\
&\equiv 98^{165} &\pmod{331} \\
&\equiv 98 \cdot (98^2)^{82} &\pmod{331} \\
&\equiv 98 \cdot 5^{82} &\pmod{331} \\
&\equiv 98 \cdot 25^{41} &\pmod{331} \\
&\equiv 133 \cdot 25^{40} &\pmod{331} \\
&\equiv 133 \cdot 294^{20} &\pmod{331} \\
&\equiv 133 \cdot 45^{10} &\pmod{331} \\
&\equiv 133 \cdot 39^5 &\pmod{331} \\
&\equiv 222 \cdot 39^4 &\pmod{331} \\
&\equiv 222 \cdot 197^2 &\pmod{331} \\
&\equiv 222 \cdot 82 &\pmod{331} \\
&\equiv -1 &\pmod{331}
\end{align}$$
using repeated squaring modulo 331, reducing every value using the modulus after every operation to avoid computation with large integers.

== Table of values ==
The following is a table of values of Legendre symbol $\left(\frac{a}{p}\right)$ with p ≤ 127, a ≤ 30, p odd prime.

a p	1	2	3	4	5	6	7	8	9	10	11	12	13	14	15	16	17	18	19	20	21	22	23	24	25	26	27	28	29	30
3	1	−1	0	1	−1	0	1	−1	0	1	−1	0	1	−1	0	1	−1	0	1	−1	0	1	−1	0	1	−1	0	1	−1	0
5	1	−1	−1	1	0	1	−1	−1	1	0	1	−1	−1	1	0	1	−1	−1	1	0	1	−1	−1	1	0	1	−1	−1	1	0
7	1	1	−1	1	−1	−1	0	1	1	−1	1	−1	−1	0	1	1	−1	1	−1	−1	0	1	1	−1	1	−1	−1	0	1	1
11	1	−1	1	1	1	−1	−1	−1	1	−1	0	1	−1	1	1	1	−1	−1	−1	1	−1	0	1	−1	1	1	1	−1	−1	−1
13	1	−1	1	1	−1	−1	−1	−1	1	1	−1	1	0	1	−1	1	1	−1	−1	−1	−1	1	1	−1	1	0	1	−1	1	1
17	1	1	−1	1	−1	−1	−1	1	1	−1	−1	−1	1	−1	1	1	0	1	1	−1	1	−1	−1	−1	1	1	−1	−1	−1	1
19	1	−1	−1	1	1	1	1	−1	1	−1	1	−1	−1	−1	−1	1	1	−1	0	1	−1	−1	1	1	1	1	−1	1	−1	1
23	1	1	1	1	−1	1	−1	1	1	−1	−1	1	1	−1	−1	1	−1	1	−1	−1	−1	−1	0	1	1	1	1	−1	1	−1
29	1	−1	−1	1	1	1	1	−1	1	−1	−1	−1	1	−1	−1	1	−1	−1	−1	1	−1	1	1	1	1	−1	−1	1	0	1
31	1	1	−1	1	1	−1	1	1	1	1	−1	−1	−1	1	−1	1	−1	1	1	1	−1	−1	−1	−1	1	−1	−1	1	−1	−1
37	1	−1	1	1	−1	−1	1	−1	1	1	1	1	−1	−1	−1	1	−1	−1	−1	−1	1	−1	−1	−1	1	1	1	1	−1	1
41	1	1	−1	1	1	−1	−1	1	1	1	−1	−1	−1	−1	−1	1	−1	1	−1	1	1	−1	1	−1	1	−1	−1	−1	−1	−1
43	1	−1	−1	1	−1	1	−1	−1	1	1	1	−1	1	1	1	1	1	−1	−1	−1	1	−1	1	1	1	−1	−1	−1	−1	−1
47	1	1	1	1	−1	1	1	1	1	−1	−1	1	−1	1	−1	1	1	1	−1	−1	1	−1	−1	1	1	−1	1	1	−1	−1
53	1	−1	−1	1	−1	1	1	−1	1	1	1	−1	1	−1	1	1	1	−1	−1	−1	−1	−1	−1	1	1	−1	−1	1	1	−1
59	1	−1	1	1	1	−1	1	−1	1	−1	−1	1	−1	−1	1	1	1	−1	1	1	1	1	−1	−1	1	1	1	1	1	−1
61	1	−1	1	1	1	−1	−1	−1	1	−1	−1	1	1	1	1	1	−1	−1	1	1	−1	1	−1	−1	1	−1	1	−1	−1	−1
67	1	−1	−1	1	−1	1	−1	−1	1	1	−1	−1	−1	1	1	1	1	−1	1	−1	1	1	1	1	1	1	−1	−1	1	−1
71	1	1	1	1	1	1	−1	1	1	1	−1	1	−1	−1	1	1	−1	1	1	1	−1	−1	−1	1	1	−1	1	−1	1	1
73	1	1	1	1	−1	1	−1	1	1	−1	−1	1	−1	−1	−1	1	−1	1	1	−1	−1	−1	1	1	1	−1	1	−1	−1	−1
79	1	1	−1	1	1	−1	−1	1	1	1	1	−1	1	−1	−1	1	−1	1	1	1	1	1	1	−1	1	1	−1	−1	−1	−1
83	1	−1	1	1	−1	−1	1	−1	1	1	1	1	−1	−1	−1	1	1	−1	−1	−1	1	−1	1	−1	1	1	1	1	1	1
89	1	1	−1	1	1	−1	−1	1	1	1	1	−1	−1	−1	−1	1	1	1	−1	1	1	1	−1	−1	1	−1	−1	−1	−1	−1
97	1	1	1	1	−1	1	−1	1	1	−1	1	1	−1	−1	−1	1	−1	1	−1	−1	−1	1	−1	1	1	−1	1	−1	−1	−1
101	1	−1	−1	1	1	1	−1	−1	1	−1	−1	−1	1	1	−1	1	1	−1	1	1	1	1	1	1	1	−1	−1	−1	−1	1
103	1	1	−1	1	−1	−1	1	1	1	−1	−1	−1	1	1	1	1	1	1	1	−1	−1	−1	1	−1	1	1	−1	1	1	1
107	1	−1	1	1	−1	−1	−1	−1	1	1	1	1	1	1	−1	1	−1	−1	1	−1	−1	−1	1	−1	1	−1	1	−1	1	1
109	1	−1	1	1	1	−1	1	−1	1	−1	−1	1	−1	−1	1	1	−1	−1	−1	1	1	1	−1	−1	1	1	1	1	1	−1
113	1	1	−1	1	−1	−1	1	1	1	−1	1	−1	1	1	1	1	−1	1	−1	−1	−1	1	−1	−1	1	1	−1	1	−1	1
127	1	1	−1	1	−1	−1	−1	1	1	−1	1	−1	1	−1	1	1	1	1	1	−1	1	1	−1	−1	1	1	−1	−1	−1	1
