= Octic reciprocity =

Reciprocity law relating the residues of 8th powers modulo primes

In number theory, octic reciprocity is a reciprocity law relating the residues of 8th powers modulo primes, analogous to the law of quadratic reciprocity, cubic reciprocity, and quartic reciprocity.

There is a rational reciprocity law for 8th powers, due to Williams. Define the symbol $\left(\frac xp\right)_k$ to be +1 if x is a k-th power modulo the prime p and -1 otherwise. Let p and q be distinct primes congruent to 1 modulo 8, such that $\left(\frac pq\right)_4 = \left(\frac qp\right)_4 = +1 .$ Let p = a^{2} + b^{2} = c^{2} + 2d^{2} and q = A^{2} + B^{2} = C^{2} + 2D^{2}, with aA odd. Then

$$\left(\frac pq\right)_8 \left(\frac qp\right)_8 = \left(\frac{aB-bA}q\right)_4 \left(\frac{cD-dC}q\right)_2 \ .$$

== See also ==
- Artin reciprocity
- Eisenstein reciprocity
