= Eisenstein sum =

In mathematics, an Eisenstein sum is a finite sum depending on a finite field and related to a Gauss sum. Eisenstein sums were introduced by Eisenstein in 1848, named "Eisenstein sums" by Stickelberger in 1890, and rediscovered by Yamamoto in 1985, who called them relative Gauss sums.

== Definition ==
The Eisenstein sum is given by

$$E(\chi,\alpha)=\sum_{Tr_{F/K}t=\alpha}\chi(t)$$

where F is a finite extension of the finite field K, and χ is a character of the multiplicative group of F, and α is an element of K.

== Bibliography ==
- Berndt, Bruce C.; Evans, Ronald J. (1979), "Sums of Gauss, Eisenstein, Jacobi, Jacobsthal, and Brewer", Illinois Journal of Mathematics, 23 (3): 374–437, doi:10.1215/ijm/1256048104, ISSN 0019-2082, MR 0537798, Zbl 0393.12029
- Eisenstein, Gotthold (1848), "Zur Theorie der quadratischen Zerfällung der Primzahlen 8n + 3,7n + 2 und 7n + 4", Journal für die Reine und Angewandte Mathematik, 37: 97–126, ISSN 0075-4102
- Lemmermeyer, Franz (2000), Reciprocity laws, Springer Monographs in Mathematics, Berlin, New York: Springer-Verlag, ISBN 978-3-540-66957-9, MR 1761696, Zbl 0949.11002
- Lidl, Rudolf; Niederreiter, Harald (1997), Finite fields, Encyclopedia of Mathematics and Its Applications, vol. 20 (2nd ed.), Cambridge University Press, ISBN 0-521-39231-4, Zbl 0866.11069
- Stickelberger, Ludwig (1890), "Ueber eine Verallgemeinerung der Kreistheilung", Mathematische Annalen, 37 (3): 321–367, doi:10.1007/bf01721360, JFM 22.0100.01, MR 1510649, S2CID 121239748
- Yamamoto, K. (1985), "On congruences arising from relative Gauss sums", Number theory and combinatorics. Japan 1984 (Tokyo, Okayama and Kyoto, 1984), Singapore: World Sci. Publishing, pp. 423–446, MR 0827799, Zbl 0634.12017
