= Eisenstein reciprocity =

Law in algebraic number theory

In algebraic number theory Eisenstein's reciprocity law is a reciprocity law that extends the law of quadratic reciprocity and the cubic reciprocity law to residues of higher powers. It is one of the earliest and simplest of the higher reciprocity laws, and is a consequence of several later and stronger reciprocity laws such as the Artin reciprocity law. It was introduced by Eisenstein (1850), though Jacobi had previously announced (without proof) a similar result for the special cases of 5th, 8th and 12th powers in 1839.

== Background and notation ==
Let $m > 1$ be an integer, and let $\mathcal{O}_m$ be the ring of integers of the m-th cyclotomic field $\mathbb{Q}(\zeta_m),$ where $\zeta_m=e^{2 \pi i\frac{1}{m}}$ is a primitive m-th root of unity.

The numbers $\zeta_m, \zeta_m^2,\dots\zeta_m^m=1$ are units in $\mathcal{O}_m.$ (There are other units as well.)

=== Primary numbers ===
A number $\alpha\in\mathcal{O}_m$ is called primary if it is not a unit, is relatively prime to $m$, and is congruent to a rational (i.e. in $\mathbb{Z}$) integer $(\!\bmod{(1-\zeta_m)^2}).$

The following lemma shows that primary numbers in $\mathcal{O}_m$ are analogous to positive integers in $\mathbb{Z}.$

Suppose that $\alpha, \beta\in\mathcal{O}_m$ and that both $\alpha$ and $\beta$ are relatively prime to $m.$ Then

- There is an integer $c$ making $\zeta_m^c\alpha$ primary. This integer is unique $(\!\bmod{m}).$
- if $\alpha$ and $\beta$ are primary then $\alpha\pm\beta$ is primary, provided that $\alpha\pm\beta$ is coprime with $m$.
- if $\alpha$ and $\beta$ are primary then $\alpha\beta$ is primary.
- $\alpha^m$ is primary.

The significance of the $1-\zeta_m$ that appears in the definition is most easily seen when $m=l$ is a prime. In that case $l=(1-\zeta_l)(1-\zeta_l^2)\dots(1-\zeta_l^{l-1}).$ Furthermore, the prime ideal $(l)$ of $\mathbb{Z}$ is totally ramified in $\mathbb{Q}(\zeta_l)$

$$(l)=(1-\zeta_l)^{l-1},$$

and the ideal $(1-\zeta_l)$ is prime of degree 1.

=== m-th power residue symbol ===
For $\alpha, \beta\in\mathcal{O}_m,$ the m-th power residue symbol for $\mathcal{O}_m$ is either zero or an m-th root of unity:

$$\left(\frac{\alpha}{\beta }\right)_m
=
\begin{cases}
\zeta \mbox{ where }\zeta^m=1&\mbox{ if }\alpha\mbox{ and }\beta\mbox{ are relatively prime}\\
0 &\mbox{ otherwise}.\\
\end{cases}$$

It is the m-th power version of the classical (quadratic, m = 2) Jacobi symbol (assuming $\alpha$ and $\beta$ are relatively prime):

- If $\eta\in\mathcal{O}_m$ and $\alpha\equiv\eta^m\;(\bmod{\beta})$ then $\left(\frac{\alpha}{\beta }\right)_m = 1.$
- If $\left(\frac{\alpha}{\beta }\right)_m \neq1$ then $\alpha$ is not an m-th power $(\!\bmod{\beta}).$
- If $\left(\frac{\alpha}{\beta }\right)_m =1$ then $\alpha$ may or may not be an m-th power $(\!\bmod{\beta}).$

== Statement of the theorem ==
Let $m\in\mathbb{Z}$ be an odd prime and $a\in\mathbb{Z}$ an integer relatively prime to $m.$ Then

=== First supplement ===
$\left(\frac{\zeta_m}{a }\right)_m = \zeta_m^{\frac{a^{m-1}-1}{m}}.$

=== Second supplement ===
$\left(\frac{1-\zeta_m}{a }\right)_m = \left(\frac{\zeta_m}{a }\right)_m^{\frac{m+1}{2}}.$

=== Eisenstein reciprocity ===
Let $\alpha\in\mathcal{O}_m$ be primary (and therefore relatively prime to $m$), and assume that $\alpha$ is also relatively prime to $a$. Then

$$\left(\frac{\alpha}{a }\right)_m =
\left(\frac{a}{\alpha }\right)_m.$$

== Proof ==
The theorem is a consequence of the Stickelberger relation.

Weil (1975) gives a historical discussion of some early reciprocity laws, including a proof of Eisenstein's law using Gauss and Jacobi sums that is based on Eisenstein's original proof.

== Generalization ==
In 1922 Takagi proved that if $K\supset\mathbb{Q}(\zeta_l)$ is an arbitrary algebraic number field containing the $l$-th roots of unity for a prime $l$, then Eisenstein's law for $l$-th powers holds in $K.$

== Applications ==
=== First case of Fermat's Last Theorem ===
Assume that $p$ is an odd prime, that $x^p+y^p+z^p=0$ for pairwise relatively prime integers (i.e. in $\mathbb{Z}$) $x,y,z$ and that $p\nmid xyz.\;\;$

This is the first case of Fermat's Last Theorem. (The second case is when $p\mid xyz.\;$) Eisenstein reciprocity can be used to prove the following theorems

(Wieferich 1909) Under the above assumptions, $2^{p-1}\equiv 1 \; (\!\bmod{p^2}).$

The only primes below 6.7×10^{15} that satisfy this are 1093 and 3511. See Wieferich primes for details and current records.

(Mirimanoff 1911) Under the above assumptions $3^{p-1}\equiv 1 \; (\!\bmod{p^2}).$

Analogous results are true for all primes ≤ 113, but the proof does not use Eisenstein's law. See Wieferich prime#Connection with Fermat's Last Theorem.

(Furtwängler 1912) Under the above assumptions, for every prime $r\mid x,\;\;r^{p-1}\equiv1 \; (\!\bmod{p^2}).$

(Furtwängler 1912) Under the above assumptions, for every prime $r\mid (x-y),\;\;r^{p-1}\equiv1 \; (\!\bmod{p^2}).$

(Vandiver) Under the above assumptions, if in addition $p>3,$ then $x^p\equiv x,\; y^p\equiv y$, and $z^p\equiv z \; (\!\bmod{p^3}).$

=== Powers mod most primes ===
Eisenstein's law can be used to prove the following theorem (Trost, Ankeny, Rogers). Suppose $a\in\mathbb{Z}$ and that $l\nmid a$ where $l$ is an odd prime. If $x^l\equiv a \; (\!\bmod{p})$ is solvable for all but finitely many primes $p$, then $a=b^l.$

== See also ==
- Quartic reciprocity
- Octic reciprocity
- Wieferich's criterion
- Mirimanoff's congruence
