= Quadratic reciprocity =

Gives conditions for the solvability of quadratic equations modulo prime numbers

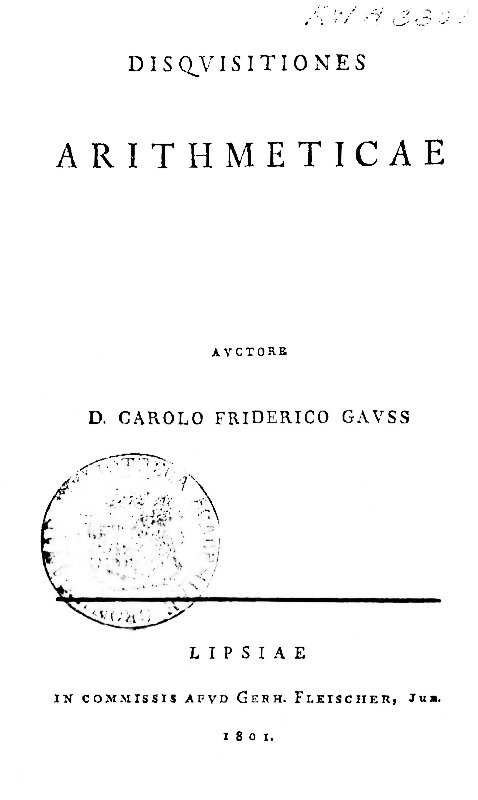
Gauss published the first and second proofs of the law of quadratic reciprocity on arts 125–146 and 262 of Disquisitiones Arithmeticae in 1801.

In number theory, the law of quadratic reciprocity is a theorem about modular arithmetic that gives conditions for the solvability of quadratic equations modulo prime numbers. Due to its subtlety, it has many formulations, but the most standard statement is:

Law of quadratic reciprocity—Let p and q be distinct odd prime numbers, and define the Legendre symbol as

$$\left(\frac{q}{p}\right)
=\begin{cases}
1 & \text{if } n^2 \equiv q \pmod p \text{ for some integer } n\\
-1 & \text{otherwise}.
\end{cases}$$

Then

$$\left(\frac{p}{q}\right) \left(\frac{q}{p}\right) = (-1)^{\frac{p-1}{2}\frac{q-1}{2}}.$$

This law, together with its supplements, allows the easy calculation of any Legendre symbol, making it possible to determine whether there is an integer solution for any quadratic equation of the form $x^2\equiv a \pmod p$ for an odd prime $p$; that is, to determine the "perfect squares" modulo $p$. However, this is a non-constructive result: it gives no help at all for finding a specific solution; for this, other methods are required. For example, in the case $p\equiv 3 \pmod 4$ using Euler's criterion one can give an explicit formula for the "square roots" modulo $p$ of a quadratic residue $a$, namely,

$$\pm a^{\frac{p+1}{4}}$$

indeed,

$$\left (\pm a^{\frac{p+1}{4}} \right )^2=a^{\frac{p+1}{2}}=a\cdot a^{\frac{p-1}{2}}\equiv a\left(\frac{a}{p}\right)=a \pmod p.$$

This formula only works if it is known in advance that $a$ is a quadratic residue, which can be checked using the law of quadratic reciprocity.

The quadratic reciprocity theorem was conjectured by Leonhard Euler and Adrien-Marie Legendre and first proved by Carl Friedrich Gauss, who referred to it as the "fundamental theorem" in his Disquisitiones Arithmeticae and his papers, writing

The fundamental theorem must certainly be regarded as one of the most elegant of its type. (Art. 151)

Privately, Gauss referred to it as the "golden theorem". He published six proofs for it, and two more were found in his posthumous papers. There are now over 240 published proofs. The shortest known proof is included below, together with short proofs of the law's supplements (the Legendre symbols of −1 and 2).

Generalizing the reciprocity law to higher powers has been a leading problem in mathematics, and has been crucial to the development of much of the machinery of modern algebra, number theory, and algebraic geometry, culminating in Artin reciprocity, class field theory, and the Langlands program.

== Motivating examples ==
Quadratic reciprocity arises from certain subtle factorization patterns involving perfect square numbers. In this section, we give examples which lead to the general case.

=== Factoring n^{2} − 5 ===
Consider the polynomial $f(n) = n^2 - 5$ and its values for $n \in \N.$ The prime factorizations of these values are given as follows:

n	$f(n)$		n	$f(n)$		n	$f(n)$	
1	−4	−2^{2}	16	251	251	31	956	2^{2}⋅239
2	−1	−1	17	284	2^{2}⋅71	32	1019	1019
3	4	2^{2}	18	319	11⋅29	33	1084	2^{2}⋅271
4	11	11	19	356	2^{2}⋅89	34	1151	1151
5	20	2^{2}⋅5	20	395	5⋅79	35	1220	2^{2}⋅5⋅61
6	31	31	21	436	2^{2}⋅109	36	1291	1291
7	44	2^{2}⋅11	22	479	479	37	1364	2^{2}⋅11⋅31
8	59	59	23	524	2^{2}⋅131	38	1439	1439
9	76	2^{2}⋅19	24	571	571	39	1516	2^{2}⋅379
10	95	5⋅19	25	620	2^{2}⋅5⋅31	40	1595	5⋅11⋅29
11	116	2^{2}⋅29	26	671	11⋅61	41	1676	2^{2}⋅419
12	139	139	27	724	2^{2}⋅181	42	1759	1759
13	164	2^{2}⋅41	28	779	19⋅41	43	1844	2^{2}⋅461
14	191	191	29	836	2^{2}⋅11⋅19	44	1931	1931
15	220	2^{2}⋅5⋅11	30	895	5⋅179	45	2020	2^{2}⋅5⋅101

The prime factors $p$ dividing $f(n)$ are $p=2,5$, and every prime whose final digit is $1$ or $9$; no primes ending in $3$ or $7$ ever appear. Now, $p$ is a prime factor of some $n^2-5$ whenever $n^2 - 5 \equiv 0 \pmod p$, i.e. whenever $n^2 \equiv 5 \pmod p,$ i.e. whenever 5 is a quadratic residue modulo $p$. This happens for $p= 2, 5$ and those primes with $p\equiv 1, 4 \pmod 5,$ and the latter numbers $1=(\pm1)^2$ and $4=(\pm2)^2$ are precisely the quadratic residues modulo $5$. Therefore, except for $p = 2,5$, we have that $5$ is a quadratic residue modulo $p$ iff $p$ is a quadratic residue modulo $5$.

The law of quadratic reciprocity gives a similar characterization of prime divisors of $f(n)=n^2 - q$ for any prime q, which leads to a characterization for any integer $q$.

=== Patterns among quadratic residues ===
Let p be an odd prime. A number modulo p is a quadratic residue whenever it is congruent to a square (mod p); otherwise it is a quadratic non-residue. ("Quadratic" can be dropped if it is clear from the context.) Here we exclude zero as a special case. Then as a consequence of the fact that the multiplicative group of a finite field of order p is cyclic of order p-1, the following statements hold:

- There are an equal number of quadratic residues and non-residues; and
- The product of two quadratic residues is a residue, the product of a residue and a non-residue is a non-residue, and the product of two non-residues is a residue.

For the avoidance of doubt, these statements do not hold if the modulus is not prime. For example, there are only 3 quadratic residues (1, 4 and 9) in the multiplicative group modulo 15. Moreover, although 7 and 8 are quadratic non-residues, their product 7x8 = 11 is also a quadratic non-residue, in contrast to the prime case.

Quadratic residues appear as entries in the following table, indexed by the row number as modulus and column number as root:

Squares mod primes
n	1	2	3	4	5	6	7	8	9	10	11	12	13	14	15	16	17	18	19	20	21	22	23	24	25
n^{2}	1	4	9	16	25	36	49	64	81	100	121	144	169	196	225	256	289	324	361	400	441	484	529	576	625
mod 3	1	1	0	1	1	0	1	1	0	1	1	0	1	1	0	1	1	0	1	1	0	1	1	0	1
mod 5	1	4	4	1	0	1	4	4	1	0	1	4	4	1	0	1	4	4	1	0	1	4	4	1	0
mod 7	1	4	2	2	4	1	0	1	4	2	2	4	1	0	1	4	2	2	4	1	0	1	4	2	2
mod 11	1	4	9	5	3	3	5	9	4	1	0	1	4	9	5	3	3	5	9	4	1	0	1	4	9
mod 13	1	4	9	3	12	10	10	12	3	9	4	1	0	1	4	9	3	12	10	10	12	3	9	4	1
mod 17	1	4	9	16	8	2	15	13	13	15	2	8	16	9	4	1	0	1	4	9	16	8	2	15	13
mod 19	1	4	9	16	6	17	11	7	5	5	7	11	17	6	16	9	4	1	0	1	4	9	16	6	17
mod 23	1	4	9	16	2	13	3	18	12	8	6	6	8	12	18	3	13	2	16	9	4	1	0	1	4
mod 29	1	4	9	16	25	7	20	6	23	13	5	28	24	22	22	24	28	5	13	23	6	20	7	25	16
mod 31	1	4	9	16	25	5	18	2	19	7	28	20	14	10	8	8	10	14	20	28	7	19	2	18	5
mod 37	1	4	9	16	25	36	12	27	7	26	10	33	21	11	3	34	30	28	28	30	34	3	11	21	33
mod 41	1	4	9	16	25	36	8	23	40	18	39	21	5	32	20	10	2	37	33	31	31	33	37	2	10
mod 43	1	4	9	16	25	36	6	21	38	14	35	15	40	24	10	41	31	23	17	13	11	11	13	17	23
mod 47	1	4	9	16	25	36	2	17	34	6	27	3	28	8	37	21	7	42	32	24	18	14	12	12	14

This table is complete for odd primes less than 50. To check whether a number m is a quadratic residue mod one of these primes p, find a ≡ m (mod p) and 0 ≤ a < p. If a is in row p, then m is a residue (mod p); if a is not in row p of the table, then m is a nonresidue (mod p).

The quadratic reciprocity law is the statement that certain patterns found in the table are true in general.

=== Legendre's version ===
Another way to organize the data is to see which primes are quadratic residues mod which other primes, as illustrated in the following table. The entry in row p column q is R if q is a quadratic residue (mod p); if it is a nonresidue the entry is N.

If the row, or the column, or both, are ≡ 1 (mod 4) the entry is blue or green; if both row and column are ≡ 3 (mod 4), it is yellow or orange.

The blue and green entries are symmetric around the diagonal: The entry for row p, column q is R (resp N) if and only if the entry at row q, column p, is R (resp N).

The yellow and orange ones, on the other hand, are antisymmetric: The entry for row p, column q is R (resp N) if and only if the entry at row q, column p, is N (resp R).

The reciprocity law states that these patterns hold for all p and q.

Legend
R	q is a residue (mod p)	q ≡ 1 (mod 4) or p ≡ 1 (mod 4) (or both) (reciprocating)
N	q is a nonresidue (mod p)	q ≡ 1 (mod 4) or p ≡ 1 (mod 4) (or both) (reciprocating)
R	q is a residue (mod p)	q ≡ p ≡ 3 (mod 4) (non-reciprocating)
N	q is a nonresidue (mod p)	q ≡ p ≡ 3 (mod 4) (non-reciprocating)

		q																							
		3	5	7	11	13	17	19	23	29	31	37	41	43	47	53	59	61	67	71	73	79	83	89	97
p	3		N	R	N	R	N	R	N	N	R	R	N	R	N	N	N	R	R	N	R	R	N	N	R
p	5	N		N	R	N	N	R	N	R	R	N	R	N	N	N	R	R	N	R	N	R	N	R	N
p	7	N	N		R	N	N	N	R	R	N	R	N	R	N	R	N	N	R	R	N	R	N	N	N
p	11	R	R	N		N	N	N	R	N	R	R	N	N	R	R	R	N	R	R	N	N	N	R	R
p	13	R	N	N	N		R	N	R	R	N	N	N	R	N	R	N	R	N	N	N	R	N	N	N
p	17	N	N	N	N	R		R	N	N	N	N	N	R	R	R	R	N	R	N	N	N	R	R	N
p	19	N	R	R	R	N	R		R	N	N	N	N	R	R	N	N	R	N	N	R	N	R	N	N
p	23	R	N	N	N	R	N	N		R	R	N	R	N	R	N	R	N	N	R	R	N	N	N	N
p	29	N	R	R	N	R	N	N	R		N	N	N	N	N	R	R	N	R	R	N	N	R	N	N
p	31	N	R	R	N	N	N	R	N	N		N	R	N	R	N	R	N	R	R	N	N	N	N	R
p	37	R	N	R	R	N	N	N	N	N	N		R	N	R	R	N	N	R	R	R	N	R	N	N
p	41	N	R	N	N	N	N	N	R	N	R	R		R	N	N	R	R	N	N	R	N	R	N	N
p	43	N	N	N	R	R	R	N	R	N	R	N	R		R	R	R	N	R	N	N	R	R	N	R
p	47	R	N	R	N	N	R	N	N	N	N	R	N	N		R	R	R	N	R	N	R	R	R	R
p	53	N	N	R	R	R	R	N	N	R	N	R	N	R	R		R	N	N	N	N	N	N	R	R
p	59	R	R	R	N	N	R	R	N	R	N	N	R	N	N	R		N	N	R	N	R	N	N	N
p	61	R	R	N	N	R	N	R	N	N	N	N	R	N	R	N	N		N	N	R	N	R	N	R
p	67	N	N	N	N	N	R	R	R	R	N	R	N	N	R	N	R	N		R	R	N	R	R	N
p	71	R	R	N	N	N	N	R	N	R	N	R	N	R	N	N	N	N	N		R	R	R	R	N
p	73	R	N	N	N	N	N	R	R	N	N	R	R	N	N	N	N	R	R	R		R	N	R	R
p	79	N	R	N	R	R	N	R	R	N	R	N	N	N	N	N	N	N	R	N	R		R	R	R
p	83	R	N	R	R	N	R	N	R	R	R	R	R	N	N	N	R	R	N	N	N	N		N	N
p	89	N	R	N	R	N	R	N	N	N	N	N	N	N	R	R	N	N	R	R	R	R	N		R
p	97	R	N	N	R	N	N	N	N	N	R	N	N	R	R	R	N	R	N	N	R	R	N	R	

Ordering the rows and columns mod 4 makes the pattern clearer.

		q																							
		83	79	71	67	59	47	43	31	23	19	11	7	3	5	13	17	29	37	41	53	61	73	89	97
p	83		N	N	N	R	N	N	R	R	N	R	R	R	N	N	R	R	R	R	N	R	N	N	N
p	79	R		N	R	N	N	N	R	R	R	R	N	N	R	R	N	N	N	N	N	N	R	R	R
p	71	R	R		N	N	N	R	N	N	R	N	N	R	R	N	N	R	R	N	N	N	R	R	N
p	67	R	N	R		R	R	N	N	R	R	N	N	N	N	N	R	R	R	N	N	N	R	R	N
p	59	N	R	R	N		N	N	N	N	R	N	R	R	R	N	R	R	N	R	R	N	N	N	N
p	47	R	R	R	N	R		N	N	N	N	N	R	R	N	N	R	N	R	N	R	R	N	R	R
p	43	R	R	N	R	R	R		R	R	N	R	N	N	N	R	R	N	N	R	R	N	N	N	R
p	31	N	N	R	R	R	R	N		N	R	N	R	N	R	N	N	N	N	R	N	N	N	N	R
p	23	N	N	R	N	R	R	N	R		N	N	N	R	N	R	N	R	N	R	N	N	R	N	N
p	19	R	N	N	N	N	R	R	N	R		R	R	N	R	N	R	N	N	N	N	R	R	N	N
p	11	N	N	R	R	R	R	N	R	R	N		N	R	R	N	N	N	R	N	R	N	N	R	R
p	7	N	R	R	R	N	N	R	N	R	N	R		N	N	N	N	R	R	N	R	N	N	N	N
p	3	N	R	N	R	N	N	R	R	N	R	N	R		N	R	N	N	R	N	N	R	R	N	R
p	5	N	R	R	N	R	N	N	R	N	R	R	N	N		N	N	R	N	R	N	R	N	R	N
p	13	N	R	N	N	N	N	R	N	R	N	N	N	R	N		R	R	N	N	R	R	N	N	N
p	17	R	N	N	R	R	R	R	N	N	R	N	N	N	N	R		N	N	N	R	N	N	R	N
p	29	R	N	R	R	R	N	N	N	R	N	N	R	N	R	R	N		N	N	R	N	N	N	N
p	37	R	N	R	R	N	R	N	N	N	N	R	R	R	N	N	N	N		R	R	N	R	N	N
p	41	R	N	N	N	R	N	R	R	R	N	N	N	N	R	N	N	N	R		N	R	R	N	N
p	53	N	N	N	N	R	R	R	N	N	N	R	R	N	N	R	R	R	R	N		N	N	R	R
p	61	R	N	N	N	N	R	N	N	N	R	N	N	R	R	R	N	N	N	R	N		R	N	R
p	73	N	R	R	R	N	N	N	N	R	R	N	N	R	N	N	N	N	R	R	N	R		R	R
p	89	N	R	R	R	N	R	N	N	N	N	R	N	N	R	N	R	N	N	N	R	N	R		R
p	97	N	R	N	N	N	R	R	R	N	N	R	N	R	N	N	N	N	N	N	R	R	R	R	

== Supplements to quadratic reciprocity ==
The supplements provide solutions to specific cases of quadratic reciprocity. They are often quoted as partial results, without having to resort to the complete theorem.

=== q = ±1 and the first supplement ===
Trivially 1 is a quadratic residue for all primes. The question becomes more interesting for −1. Examining the table, we find −1 in rows 5, 13, 17, 29, 37, and 41 but not in rows 3, 7, 11, 19, 23, 31, 43 or 47. The former set of primes are all congruent to 1 modulo 4, and the latter are congruent to 3 modulo 4.

First Supplement to Quadratic Reciprocity. The congruence $x^2 \equiv -1 \pmod{p}$ is solvable if and only if $p$ is congruent to 1 modulo 4.

=== q = ±2 and the second supplement ===
Examining the table, we find 2 in rows 7, 17, 23, 31, 41, and 47, but not in rows 3, 5, 11, 13, 19, 29, 37, or 43. The former primes are all ≡ ±1 (mod 8), and the latter are all ≡ ±3 (mod 8). This leads to

Second Supplement to Quadratic Reciprocity. The congruence $x^2 \equiv 2 \pmod{p}$ is solvable if and only if $p$ is congruent to ±1 modulo 8.

−2 is in rows 3, 11, 17, 19, 41, 43, but not in rows 5, 7, 13, 23, 29, 31, 37, or 47. The former are ≡ 1 or ≡ 3 (mod 8), and the latter are ≡ 5, 7 (mod 8).

=== q = ±3 ===
3 is in rows 11, 13, 23, 37, and 47, but not in rows 5, 7, 17, 19, 29, 31, 41, or 43. The former are ≡ ±1 (mod 12) and the latter are all ≡ ±5 (mod 12).

−3 is in rows 7, 13, 19, 31, 37, and 43 but not in rows 5, 11, 17, 23, 29, 41, or 47. The former are ≡ 1 (mod 3) and the latter ≡ 2 (mod 3).

Since the only residue (mod 3) is 1, we see that −3 is a quadratic residue modulo every prime which is a residue modulo 3.

=== q = ±5 ===
5 is in rows 11, 19, 29, 31, and 41 but not in rows 3, 7, 13, 17, 23, 37, 43, or 47. The former are ≡ ±1 (mod 5) and the latter are ≡ ±2 (mod 5).

Since the only residues (mod 5) are ±1, we see that 5 is a quadratic residue modulo every prime which is a residue modulo 5.

−5 is in rows 3, 7, 23, 29, 41, 43, and 47 but not in rows 11, 13, 17, 19, 31, or 37. The former are ≡ 1, 3, 7, 9 (mod 20) and the latter are ≡ 11, 13, 17, 19 (mod 20).

=== Higher q ===
The observations about −3 and 5 continue to hold: −7 is a residue modulo p if and only if p is a residue modulo 7, −11 is a residue modulo p if and only if p is a residue modulo 11, 13 is a residue (mod p) if and only if p is a residue modulo 13, etc. The more complicated-looking rules for the quadratic characters of 3 and −5, which depend upon congruences modulo 12 and 20 respectively, are simply the ones for −3 and 5 working with the first supplement.

Example. For −5 to be a residue (mod p), either both 5 and −1 have to be residues (mod p) or they both have to be non-residues: i.e., p ≡ ±1 (mod 5) and p ≡ 1 (mod 4) or p ≡ ±2 (mod 5) and p ≡ 3 (mod 4). Using the Chinese remainder theorem these are equivalent to p ≡ 1, 9 (mod 20) or p ≡ 3, 7 (mod 20).

The generalization of the rules for −3 and 5 is Gauss's statement of quadratic reciprocity.

== Statement of the theorem ==
Quadratic Reciprocity (Gauss's statement). If $q \equiv 1 \pmod{4}$, then the congruence $x^2 \equiv p \pmod{q}$ is solvable if and only if $x^2 \equiv q \pmod{p}$ is solvable. If $q \equiv 3 \pmod{4}$ and $p \equiv 3 \pmod{4}$, then the congruence $x^2 \equiv p \pmod{q}$ is solvable if and only if $x^2 \equiv -q \pmod{p}$ is solvable.

Quadratic Reciprocity (combined statement). Define $q^* = (-1)^{\frac{q-1}{2}}q$. Then the congruence $x^2 \equiv p \pmod{q}$ is solvable if and only if $x^2 \equiv q^* \pmod{p}$ is solvable.

Quadratic Reciprocity (Legendre's statement). If p or q are congruent to 1 modulo 4, then: $x^2 \equiv q \pmod{p}$ is solvable if and only if $x^2 \equiv p \pmod{q}$ is solvable. If p and q are congruent to 3 modulo 4, then: $x^2 \equiv q \pmod{p}$ is solvable if and only if $x^2 \equiv p \pmod{q}$ is not solvable.

The last is immediately equivalent to the modern form stated in the introduction above. It is a simple exercise to prove that Legendre's and Gauss's statements are equivalent – it requires no more than the first supplement and the facts about multiplying residues and nonresidues.

== Proof ==
Apparently, the shortest known proof yet was published by B. Veklych in the American Mathematical Monthly.

=== Proofs of the supplements ===
The value of the Legendre symbol of $-1$ (used in the proof above) follows directly from Euler's criterion:

$$\left(\frac{-1}{p}\right)\equiv (-1)^{\frac{p-1}{2}} \pmod p$$

by Euler's criterion, but both sides of this congruence are numbers of the form $\pm 1$, so they must be equal.

Whether $2$ is a quadratic residue can be concluded if we know the number of solutions of the equation $x^2+y^2=2$ with $x, y \in \Z_p,$ which can be solved by standard methods. Namely, all its solutions where $xy\neq 0, x\neq\pm y$ can be grouped into octuplets of the form $(\pm x, \pm y), (\pm y, \pm x)$, and what is left are four solutions of the form $(\pm 1, \pm 1)$ and possibly four additional solutions where $x^2=2, y=0$ and $x=0, y^2=2$, which exist precisely if $2$ is a quadratic residue. That is, $2$ is a quadratic residue precisely if the number of solutions of this equation is divisible by $8$. And this equation can be solved in just the same way here as over the rational numbers: substitute $x=a+1, y=at+1$, where we demand that $a\neq 0$ (leaving out the two solutions $(1,\pm 1)$), then the original equation transforms into

$$a=-\frac{2(t+1)}{(t^2+1)}.$$

Here $t$ can have any value that does not make the denominator zero – for which there are $1+\left(\frac{-1}{p}\right)$ possibilities (i.e. $2$ if $-1$ is a residue, $0$ if not) – and also does not make $a$ zero, which excludes one more option, $t=-1$. Thus there are

$$p-\left(1+\left(\frac{-1}{p}\right)\right)-1$$

possibilities for $t$, and so together with the two excluded solutions there are overall $p-\left(\frac{-1}{p}\right)$ solutions of the original equation. Therefore, $2$ is a residue modulo $p$ if and only if $8$ divides $p-(-1)^{\frac{p-1}{2}}$. This is a reformulation of the condition stated above.

== History and alternative statements ==
The theorem was formulated in many ways before its modern form: Euler and Legendre did not have Gauss's congruence notation, nor did Gauss have the Legendre symbol.

In this article p and q always refer to distinct positive odd primes, and x and y to unspecified integers.

=== Fermat ===
Fermat proved (or claimed to have proved) a number of theorems about expressing a prime by a quadratic form:

$$\begin{align}
p=x^2+ y^2 \qquad &\Longleftrightarrow \qquad p=2 \quad \text{ or } \quad p\equiv 1 \pmod{4} \\
p=x^2+2y^2 \qquad &\Longleftrightarrow \qquad p=2 \quad \text{ or } \quad p\equiv 1, 3 \pmod{8} \\
p=x^2+3y^2 \qquad &\Longleftrightarrow \qquad p=3 \quad \text{ or } \quad p\equiv 1 \pmod{3} \\
\end{align}$$

He did not state the law of quadratic reciprocity, although the cases −1, ±2, and ±3 are easy deductions from these and others of his theorems.

He also claimed to have a proof that if the prime number p ends with 7, (in base 10) and the prime number q ends in 3, and p ≡ q ≡ 3 (mod 4), then

$$pq=x^2+5y^2.$$

Euler conjectured, and Lagrange proved, that

$$\begin{align}
p &\equiv 1, 9 \pmod{20}\quad \Longrightarrow \quad p = x^2+5y^2 \\
p, q &\equiv 3, 7 \pmod{20} \quad \Longrightarrow \quad pq=x^2+5y^2
\end{align}$$

Proving these and other statements of Fermat was one of the things that led mathematicians to the reciprocity theorem.

=== Euler ===
Translated into modern notation, Euler stated that for distinct odd primes p and q:

1. If q ≡ 1 (mod 4) then q is a quadratic residue (mod p) if and only if there exists some integer b such that p ≡ b^{2} (mod q).
2. If q ≡ 3 (mod 4) then q is a quadratic residue (mod p) if and only if there exists some integer b which is odd and not divisible by q such that p ≡ ±b^{2} (mod 4q).

This is equivalent to quadratic reciprocity.

He could not prove it, but he did prove the second supplement.

=== Legendre and his symbol ===
Fermat proved that if p is a prime number and a is an integer,

$$a^p\equiv a \pmod{p}.$$

Thus if p does not divide a, using the non-obvious fact (see for example Ireland and Rosen below) that the residues modulo p form a field and therefore in particular the multiplicative group is cyclic, hence there can be at most two solutions to a quadratic equation:

$$a^{\frac{p-1}{2}} \equiv \pm 1 \pmod{p}.$$

Legendre lets a and A represent positive primes ≡ 1 (mod 4) and b and B positive primes ≡ 3 (mod 4), and sets out a table of eight theorems that together are equivalent to quadratic reciprocity:

Theorem	When	it follows that
I	$b^{\frac{a-1}{2}}\equiv 1 \pmod{a}$	$a^{\frac{b-1}{2}}\equiv 1 \pmod{b}$
II	$a^{\frac{b-1}{2}}\equiv -1 \pmod{b}$	$b^{\frac{a-1}{2}}\equiv -1 \pmod{a}$
III	$a^{\frac{A-1}{2}}\equiv 1 \pmod{A}$	$A^{\frac{a-1}{2}}\equiv 1 \pmod{a}$
IV	$a^{\frac{A-1}{2}}\equiv -1 \pmod{A}$	$A^{\frac{a-1}{2}}\equiv -1 \pmod{a}$
V	$a^{\frac{b-1}{2}}\equiv 1 \pmod{b}$	$b^{\frac{a-1}{2}}\equiv 1 \pmod{a}$
VI	$b^{\frac{a-1}{2}}\equiv -1 \pmod{a}$	$a^{\frac{b-1}{2}}\equiv -1 \pmod{b}$
VII	$b^{\frac{B-1}{2}}\equiv 1 \pmod{B}$	$B^{\frac{b-1}{2}}\equiv -1 \pmod{b}$
VIII	$b^{\frac{B-1}{2}}\equiv -1 \pmod{B}$	$B^{\frac{b-1}{2}}\equiv 1 \pmod{b}$

He says that since expressions of the form

$$N^{\frac{c-1}{2}}\equiv \pm 1\pmod{c}, \qquad \gcd(N, c) = 1$$

will come up so often he will abbreviate them as:

$$\left(\frac{N}{c}\right) \equiv N^{\frac{c-1}{2}} \pmod{c} = \pm 1.$$

This is now known as the Legendre symbol, and an equivalent definition is used today: for all integers a and all odd primes p

$$\left(\frac{a}{p}\right) = \begin{cases} 0 & a \equiv 0 \pmod{p} \\ 1 & a \not\equiv 0\pmod{p} \text{ and } \exists x : a\equiv x^2\pmod{p} \\-1 &a \not\equiv 0\pmod{p} \text{ and there is no such } x. \end{cases}$$

==== Legendre's version of quadratic reciprocity ====
$$\left(\frac{p}{q}\right) = \begin{cases}
\left(\tfrac{q}{p}\right) & p\equiv 1 \pmod{4} \quad \text{ or } \quad q \equiv 1 \pmod{4} \\
-\left(\tfrac{q}{p}\right) & p \equiv 3 \pmod{4} \quad \text{ and } \quad q \equiv 3 \pmod{4}
\end{cases}$$

He notes that these can be combined:

$$\left(\frac{p}{q}\right) \left(\frac{q}{p}\right) = (-1)^{\frac{p-1}{2}\frac{q-1}{2}}.$$

A number of proofs, especially those based on Gauss's Lemma, explicitly calculate this formula.

==== The supplementary laws using Legendre symbols ====
$$\begin{align}
\left(\frac{-1}{p}\right) &= (-1)^{\frac{p-1}{2}} = \begin{cases} 1 &p \equiv 1 \pmod{4}\\ -1 & p \equiv 3 \pmod{4}\end{cases} \\
\left(\frac{2}{p}\right) &= (-1)^{\frac{p^2-1}{8}} = \begin{cases} 1 & p \equiv 1, 7 \pmod{8}\\ -1 & p \equiv 3, 5\pmod{8}\end{cases}
\end{align}$$

From these two supplements, we can obtain a third reciprocity law for the quadratic character -2 as follows:

For -2 to be a quadratic residue, either -1 or 2 are both quadratic residues, or both non-residues :$\pmod p$.

So either :$\frac{p-1}{2} \text{ or } \frac{p^2-1}{8}$ are both even, or they are both odd. The sum of these two expressions is

$\frac{p^2+4p-5}{8}$ which is an integer. Therefore,

$$\begin{align}
\left(\frac{-2}{p}\right) &= (-1)^{\frac{p^2+4p-5}{8}} = \begin{cases} 1 & p \equiv 1, 3 \pmod{8}\\ -1 & p \equiv 5, 7\pmod{8}\end{cases}
\end{align}$$

Legendre's attempt to prove reciprocity is based on a theorem of his:

Legendre's Theorem. Let a, b and c be integers where any pair of the three are relatively prime. Moreover assume that at least one of ab, bc or ca is negative (i.e. they don't all have the same sign). If

$$\begin{align}
u^2 &\equiv -bc \pmod{a} \\
v^2 &\equiv -ca \pmod{b} \\
w^2 &\equiv -ab \pmod{c}
\end{align}$$

are solvable then the following equation has a nontrivial solution in integers:

$$ax^2 + by^2 + cz^2=0.$$

Example. Theorem I is handled by letting a ≡ 1 and b ≡ 3 (mod 4) be primes and assuming that $\left (\tfrac{b}{a} \right) = 1$ and, contrary the theorem, that $\left (\tfrac{a}{b} \right ) = -1.$ Then $x^2+ay^2-bz^2=0$ has a solution, and taking congruences (mod 4) leads to a contradiction.

This technique doesn't work for Theorem VIII. Let b ≡ B ≡ 3 (mod 4), and assume

$$\left (\frac{B}{b} \right ) = \left (\frac{b}{B} \right ) = -1.$$

Then if there is another prime p ≡ 1 (mod 4) such that

$$\left (\frac{p}{b} \right ) = \left (\frac{p}{B} \right ) = -1,$$

the solvability of $Bx^2+by^2-pz^2=0$ leads to a contradiction (mod 4). But Legendre was unable to prove there has to be such a prime p; he was later able to show that all that is required is:

Legendre's Lemma. If p is a prime that is congruent to 1 modulo 4 then there exists an odd prime q such that $\left (\tfrac{p}{q} \right ) = -1.$

but he couldn't prove that either. Hilbert symbol (below) discusses how techniques based on the existence of solutions to $ax^2+by^2+cz^2=0$ can be made to work.

=== Gauss ===
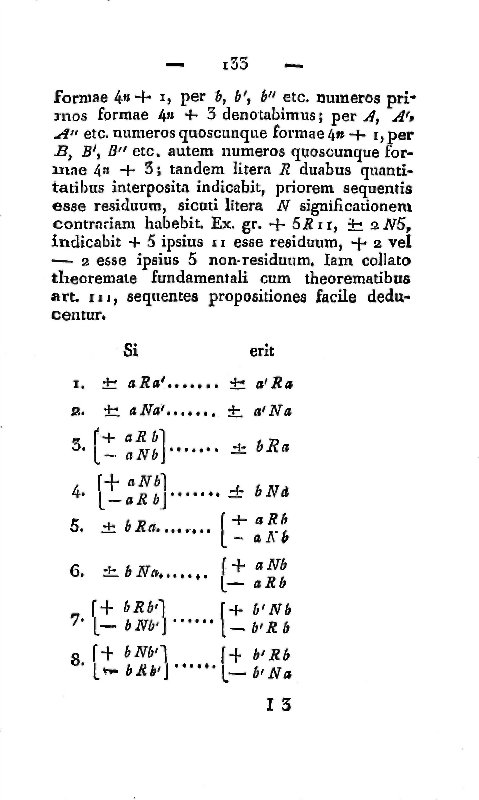
Part of Article 131 in the first edition (1801) of the Disquisitiones, listing the 8 cases of quadratic reciprocity

Gauss first proves the supplementary laws. He sets the basis for induction by proving the theorem for ±3 and ±5. Noting that it is easier to state for −3 and +5 than it is for +3 or −5, he states the general theorem in the form:

If p is a prime of the form 4n + 1 then p, but if p is of the form 4n + 3 then −p, is a quadratic residue (resp. nonresidue) of every prime, which, with a positive sign, is a residue (resp. nonresidue) of p. In the next sentence, he christens it the "fundamental theorem" (Gauss never used the word "reciprocity").

Introducing the notation a R b (resp. a N b) to mean a is a quadratic residue (resp. nonresidue) (mod b), and letting a, a′, etc. represent positive primes ≡ 1 (mod 4) and b, b′, etc. positive primes ≡ 3 (mod 4), he breaks it out into the same 8 cases as Legendre:

Case	If	Then
1)	±a R a′	±a′ R a
2)	±a N a′	±a′ N a
3)	+a R b −a N b	±b R a
4)	+a N b −a R b	±b N a
5)	±b R a	+a R b −a N b
6)	±b N a	+a N b −a R b
7)	+b R b′ −b N b′	−b′ N b +b′ R b
8)	−b N b′ +b R b′	+b′ R b −b′ N b

In the next Article he generalizes this to what are basically the rules for the Jacobi symbol (below). Letting A, A′, etc. represent any (prime or composite) positive numbers ≡ 1 (mod 4) and B, B′, etc. positive numbers ≡ 3 (mod 4):

Case	If	Then
9)	±a R A	±A R a
10)	±b R A	+A R b −A N b
11)	+a R B	±B R a
12)	−a R B	±B N a
13)	+b R B	−B N b +N R b
14)	−b R B	+B R b −B N b

All of these cases take the form "if a prime is a residue (mod a composite), then the composite is a residue or nonresidue (mod the prime), depending on the congruences (mod 4)". He proves that these follow from cases 1) - 8).

Gauss needed, and was able to prove, a lemma similar to the one Legendre needed:

Gauss's Lemma. If p is a prime congruent to 1 modulo 8 then there exists an odd prime q such that:

$$q <2\sqrt p+1 \quad \text{and} \quad \left(\frac{p}{q}\right) = -1.$$

The proof of quadratic reciprocity uses complete induction.

Gauss's Version in Legendre Symbols.

$$\left(\frac{p}{q}\right) = \begin{cases} \left(\frac{q}{p}\right) & q \equiv 1 \pmod{4} \\ \left(\frac{-q}{p}\right) & q \equiv 3 \pmod{4} \end{cases}$$

These can be combined:

Gauss's Combined Version in Legendre Symbols. Let

$$q^* = (-1)^{\frac{q-1}{2}}q.$$

In other words:

$$|q^*|=|q| \quad \text{and} \quad q^*\equiv 1 \pmod{4}.$$

Then:

$$\left(\frac{p}{q}\right) = \left(\frac{q^*}{p}\right).$$

A number of proofs of the theorem, especially those based on Gauss sums or the splitting of primes in algebraic number fields, derive this formula.

=== Other statements ===
The statements in this section are equivalent to quadratic reciprocity: if, for example, Euler's version is assumed, the Legendre-Gauss version can be deduced from it, and vice versa.

Euler's Formulation of Quadratic Reciprocity. If $p \equiv \pm q \pmod{4a}$ then $\left(\tfrac{a}{p}\right)=\left(\tfrac{a}{q}\right).$

This can be proven using Gauss's lemma.

Quadratic Reciprocity (Gauss; Fourth Proof). Let a, b, c, ... be unequal positive odd primes, whose product is n, and let m be the number of them that are ≡ 3 (mod 4); check whether n/a is a residue of a, whether n/b is a residue of b, .... The number of nonresidues found will be even when m ≡ 0, 1 (mod 4), and it will be odd if m ≡ 2, 3 (mod 4).

Gauss's fourth proof consists of proving this theorem (by comparing two formulas for the value of Gauss sums) and then restricting it to two primes. He then gives an example: Let a = 3, b = 5, c = 7, and d = 11. Three of these, 3, 7, and 11 ≡ 3 (mod 4), so m ≡ 3 (mod 4). 5×7×11 R 3; 3×7×11 R 5; 3×5×11 R 7; and 3×5×7 N 11, so there are an odd number of nonresidues.

Eisenstein's Formulation of Quadratic Reciprocity. Assume

$$p\ne q, \quad p'\ne q', \quad p \equiv p' \pmod{4}, \quad q \equiv q' \pmod{4}.$$

Then

$$\left(\frac{p}{q}\right) \left(\frac{q}{p}\right) =\left(\frac{p'}{q'}\right) \left(\frac{q'}{p'}\right).$$

Mordell's Formulation of Quadratic Reciprocity. Let a, b and c be integers. For every prime, p, dividing abc if the congruence

$$ax^2 + by^2 + cz^2 \equiv 0 \pmod{\tfrac{4abc}{p}}$$

has a nontrivial solution, then so does:

$$ax^2 + by^2 + cz^2 \equiv 0 \pmod{4abc}.$$

Zeta function formulation
As mentioned in the article on Dedekind zeta functions, quadratic reciprocity is equivalent to the zeta function of a quadratic field being the product of the Riemann zeta function and a certain Dirichlet L-function

=== Jacobi symbol ===
The Jacobi symbol is a generalization of the Legendre symbol; the main difference is that the bottom number has to be positive and odd, but does not have to be prime. If it is prime, the two symbols agree. It obeys the same rules of manipulation as the Legendre symbol. In particular

$$\begin{align}
\left(\frac{-1}{n}\right) = (-1)^{\frac{n-1}{2}} &= \begin{cases} 1 & n \equiv 1 \pmod{4}\\ -1 & n \equiv 3 \pmod{4}\end{cases} \\
\left( \frac{2}{n}\right) = (-1)^{\frac{n^2-1}{8}} &= \begin{cases} 1 & n \equiv 1, 7 \pmod{8}\\ -1 & n \equiv 3, 5\pmod{8}\end{cases} \\
\left( \frac{-2}{n}\right) = (-1)^{\frac{n^2+4n-5}{8}} &= \begin{cases} 1 & n \equiv 1, 3 \pmod{8}\\ -1 & n \equiv 5, 7\pmod{8}\end{cases}
\end{align}$$

and if both numbers are positive and odd (this is sometimes called "Jacobi's reciprocity law"):

$$\left(\frac{m}{n}\right) = (-1)^{\frac{(m-1)(n-1)}{4}}\left(\frac{n}{m}\right).$$

However, if the Jacobi symbol is 1 but the denominator is not a prime, it does not necessarily follow that the numerator is a quadratic residue of the denominator. Gauss's cases 9) - 14) above can be expressed in terms of Jacobi symbols:

$$\left (\frac{M}{p}\right) = (-1)^{\frac{(p-1)(M-1)}{4}} \left(\frac{p}{M}\right ),$$

and since p is prime the left hand side is a Legendre symbol, and we know whether M is a residue modulo p or not.

The formulas listed in the preceding section are true for Jacobi symbols as long as the symbols are defined. Euler's formula may be written

$$\left(\frac{a}{m}\right) =\left(\frac{a}{m \pm 4an}\right), \qquad n \in \Z, m\pm4an>0.$$

Example.

$$\left (\frac{2}{7} \right ) = \left (\frac{2}{15} \right ) = \left (\frac{2}{23} \right ) = \left (\frac{2}{31} \right ) = \cdots = 1.$$

2 is a residue modulo the primes 7, 23 and 31:

$$3^2 \equiv 2 \pmod{7}, \quad 5^2 \equiv 2 \pmod{23}, \quad 8^2 \equiv 2 \pmod{31}.$$

But 2 is not a quadratic residue modulo 5, so it can't be one modulo 15. This is related to the problem Legendre had: if $\left (\tfrac{a}{m} \right) = -1,$ then a is a non-residue modulo every prime in the arithmetic progression m + 4a, m + 8a, ..., if there are any primes in this series, but that wasn't proved until decades after Legendre.

Eisenstein's formula requires relative primality conditions (which are true if the numbers are prime)

Let $a, b, a', b'$ be positive odd integers such that:

$$\begin{align}
\gcd &(a,b) =\gcd(a',b')= 1 \\
&a \equiv a' \pmod{4} \\
&b \equiv b' \pmod{4}
\end{align}$$

Then

$$\left(\frac{a}{b}\right) \left(\frac{b}{a}\right) =\left(\frac{a'}{b'}\right) \left(\frac{b'}{a'}\right).$$

=== Hilbert symbol ===
The quadratic reciprocity law can be formulated in terms of the Hilbert symbol $(a,b)_v$ where a and b are any two nonzero rational numbers and v runs over all the non-trivial absolute values of the rationals (the Archimedean one and the p-adic absolute values for primes p). The Hilbert symbol $(a,b)_v$ is 1 or −1. It is defined to be 1 if and only if the equation $ax^2+by^2=z^2$ has a solution in the completion of the rationals at v other than $x=y=z=0$. The Hilbert reciprocity law states that $(a,b)_v$, for fixed a and b and varying v, is 1 for all but finitely many v and the product of $(a,b)_v$ over all v is 1. (This formally resembles the residue theorem from complex analysis.)

Over Q, Hilbert reciprocity is equivalent to the classical quadratic reciprocity law together with the supplementary laws, once one inserts the explicit formulas for the local Hilbert symbols. From a modern perspective, however, Hilbert reciprocity is the more conceptual statement, and quadratic reciprocity is recovered from it as a special case. Unlike the elementary quadratic reciprocity law, Hilbert reciprocity is a global product formula relating the local Hilbert symbols at all places. Quadratic reciprocity requires sign conditions (namely positivity of the primes involved) and a special treatment of the prime 2, whereas Hilbert reciprocity is formulated uniformly over all places of Q. Therefore, it is a more natural way of expressing quadratic reciprocity with a view toward generalization: Hilbert reciprocity extends naturally to all global fields, and this extension can be regarded as a generalization of quadratic reciprocity to arbitrary global fields.

== Connection with cyclotomic fields ==
The early proofs of quadratic reciprocity are relatively unilluminating. The situation changed when Gauss used Gauss sums to show that quadratic fields are subfields of cyclotomic fields, and implicitly deduced quadratic reciprocity from a reciprocity theorem for cyclotomic fields. His proof was cast in modern form by later algebraic number theorists. This proof served as a template for class field theory, which can be viewed as a vast generalization of quadratic reciprocity.

Robert Langlands formulated the Langlands program, which gives a conjectural vast generalization of class field theory. He wrote:

I confess that, as a student unaware of the history of the subject and unaware of the connection with cyclotomy, I did not find the law or its so-called elementary proofs appealing. I suppose, although I would not have (and could not have) expressed myself in this way that I saw it as little more than a mathematical curiosity, fit more for amateurs than for the attention of the serious mathematician that I then hoped to become. It was only in Hermann Weyl's book on the algebraic theory of numbers that I appreciated it as anything more.

== Other rings ==
There are also quadratic reciprocity laws in rings other than the integers.

=== Gaussian integers ===
In his second monograph on quartic reciprocity, Gauss stated quadratic reciprocity for the ring $\Z[i]$ of Gaussian integers, saying that it is a corollary of the biquadratic law in $\Z[i],$ but did not provide a proof of either theorem. Dirichlet showed that the law in $\Z[i]$ can be deduced from the law for $\Z$ without using quartic reciprocity.

For an odd Gaussian prime $\pi$ and a Gaussian integer $\alpha$ relatively prime to $\pi,$ define the quadratic character for $\Z[i]$ by:

$$\left[\frac{\alpha}{\pi}\right]_2 \equiv \alpha^\frac{\mathrm{N} \pi - 1}{2}\pmod{\pi} =
\begin{cases}
1 & \exists \eta \in \Z[i]: \alpha \equiv \eta^2 \pmod{\pi} \\
-1 & \text{otherwise}
\end{cases}$$

Let $\lambda = a + b i, \mu = c + d i$ be distinct Gaussian primes where a and c are odd and b and d are even. Then

$$\left [\frac{\lambda}{\mu}\right ]_2 = \left [\frac{\mu}{\lambda}\right ]_2, \qquad \left [\frac{i}{\lambda}\right ]_2 =(-1)^\frac{b}{2}, \qquad \left [\frac{1+i}{\lambda}\right ]_2 =\left(\frac{2}{a+b}\right).$$

=== Eisenstein integers ===
Consider the following third root of unity:

$$\omega = \frac{-1 + \sqrt{-3}}{2}=e^\frac{2\pi \imath}{3}.$$

The ring of Eisenstein integers is $\Z[\omega].$ For an Eisenstein prime $\pi, \mathrm{N} \pi \neq 3,$ and an Eisenstein integer $\alpha$ with $\gcd(\alpha, \pi) = 1,$ define the quadratic character for $\Z[\omega]$ by the formula

$$\left[\frac{\alpha}{\pi}\right]_2 \equiv \alpha^\frac{\mathrm{N} \pi - 1}{2}\pmod{\pi} = \begin{cases}
1 &\exists \eta \in \Z[\omega]: \alpha \equiv \eta^2 \pmod{\pi} \\
-1 &\text{otherwise}
\end{cases}$$

Let λ = a + bω and μ = c + dω be distinct Eisenstein primes where a and c are not divisible by 3 and b and d are divisible by 3. Eisenstein proved

$$\left[\frac{\lambda}{\mu}\right]_2 \left [\frac{\mu}{\lambda}\right ]_2 = (-1)^{\frac{\mathrm{N} \lambda - 1}{2}\frac{\mathrm{N} \mu-1}{2}}, \qquad \left [\frac{1-\omega}{\lambda}\right ]_2 =\left(\frac{a}{3}\right), \qquad \left [\frac{2}{\lambda}\right ]_2 =\left (\frac{2}{\mathrm{N} \lambda }\right).$$

=== Imaginary quadratic fields ===
The above laws are special cases of more general laws that hold for the ring of integers in any imaginary quadratic number field. Let k be an imaginary quadratic number field with ring of integers $\mathcal{O}_k.$ For a prime ideal $\mathfrak{p} \subset \mathcal{O}_k$ with odd norm $\mathrm{N} \mathfrak{p}$ and $\alpha\in \mathcal{O}_k,$ define the quadratic character for $\mathcal{O}_k$ as

$$\left[\frac{\alpha}{\mathfrak{p} }\right]_2 \equiv \alpha^{\frac{\mathrm{N} \mathfrak{p} - 1}{2}} \pmod{\mathfrak{p}} =
\begin{cases}
1 &\alpha\not\in \mathfrak{p} \text{ and } \exists \eta \in \mathcal{O}_k \text{ such that } \alpha - \eta^2 \in \mathfrak{p} \\
-1 & \alpha\not\in \mathfrak{p} \text{ and there is no such } \eta \\
0 & \alpha\in \mathfrak{p}
\end{cases}$$

for an arbitrary ideal $\mathfrak{a} \subset \mathcal{O}_k$ factored into prime ideals $\mathfrak{a} = \mathfrak{p}_1 \cdots \mathfrak{p}_n$ define

$$\left [\frac{\alpha}{\mathfrak{a}}\right ]_2 = \left[\frac{\alpha}{\mathfrak{p}_1 }\right]_2\cdots \left[\frac{\alpha}{\mathfrak{p}_n }\right]_2,$$

and for $\beta \in \mathcal{O}_k$ define

$$\left [\frac{\alpha}{\beta}\right ]_2 = \left [\frac{\alpha}{\beta \mathcal{O}_k}\right ]_2.$$

Let $\mathcal{O}_k = \Z \omega_1\oplus \Z \omega_2,$ i.e. $\left\{\omega_1, \omega_2\right\}$ is an integral basis for $\mathcal{O}_k.$ For $\nu \in \mathcal{O}_k$ with odd norm $\mathrm{N}\nu,$ define (ordinary) integers a, b, c, d by the equations,

$$\begin{align}
\nu\omega_1&=a\omega_1+b\omega_2\\
\nu\omega_2&=c\omega_1+d\omega_2
\end{align}$$

and a function

$$\chi(\nu) := \imath^{(b^2-a+2)c+(a^2-b+2)d+ad}.$$

For all $u, v \in \mathcal{O}_k$ with m = Nμ and n = Nν both odd, Herglotz proved

$$\left [\frac{\mu}{\nu}\right ]_2 \left[\frac{\nu}{\mu}\right]_2 = (-1)^{\frac{m-1}{2}\frac{n-1}{2}} \chi(\mu)^{m\frac{n-1}{2}} \chi(\nu)^{-n\frac{m-1}{2}}.$$

Also, if

$$\mu \equiv\mu' \pmod{4} \quad \text{and} \quad \nu \equiv\nu' \pmod{4}$$

Then

$$\left [\frac{\mu}{\nu}\right ]_2 \left[\frac{\nu}{\mu}\right]_2 = \left [\frac{\mu'}{\nu'}\right ]_2 \left[\frac{\nu'}{\mu'}\right]_2.$$

=== Polynomials over a finite field ===
Let F be a finite field with q = p^{n} elements, where p is an odd prime number and n is positive, and let F[x] be the ring of polynomials in one variable with coefficients in F. If $f,g \in F[x]$ and f is irreducible, monic, and has positive degree, define the quadratic character for F[x] in the usual manner:

$$\left(\frac{g}{f}\right) = \begin{cases}
1 & \gcd(f,g)=1 \text{ and } \exists h,k \in F[x] \text{ such that }g-h^2 = kf \\
-1 & \gcd(f,g)=1 \text{ and } g \text{ is not a square}\pmod{f}\\
0 & \gcd(f,g)\ne 1
\end{cases}$$

If $f=f_1 \cdots f_n$ is a product of monic irreducibles let

$$\left(\frac{g}{f}\right) = \left(\frac{g}{f_1}\right) \cdots \left(\frac{g}{f_n}\right).$$

Dedekind proved that if $f,g \in F[x]$ are monic and have positive degrees,

$$\left(\frac{g}{f}\right) \left(\frac{f}{g}\right) = (-1)^{\frac{q-1}{2}(\deg f)(\deg g)}.$$

== Higher powers ==
The attempt to generalize quadratic reciprocity for powers higher than the second was one of the main goals that led 19th century mathematicians, including Carl Friedrich Gauss, Peter Gustav Lejeune Dirichlet, Carl Gustav Jakob Jacobi, Gotthold Eisenstein, Richard Dedekind, Ernst Kummer, and David Hilbert to the study of general algebraic number fields and their rings of integers; specifically Kummer invented ideals in order to state and prove higher reciprocity laws.

The ninth in the list of 23 unsolved problems which David Hilbert proposed to the Congress of Mathematicians in 1900 asked for the "Proof of the most general reciprocity law [f]or an arbitrary number field". Building upon work by Philipp Furtwängler, Teiji Takagi, Helmut Hasse and others, Emil Artin discovered Artin reciprocity in 1923, a general theorem for which all known reciprocity laws are special cases, and proved it in 1927.

== See also ==
- Dedekind zeta function
- Rational reciprocity law
- Zolotarev's lemma
