= Eisenstein's theorem =

On power series with rational coefficients that are algebraic functions

In mathematics, Eisenstein's theorem, named after the German mathematician Gotthold Eisenstein, applies to the coefficients of any power series which is an algebraic function with rational number coefficients. Through the theorem, it is readily demonstrable, for example, that the exponential function must be a transcendental function.

== Theorem ==
Suppose that

$$\sum_{}^{} a_n t^n$$

is a formal power series with rational coefficients a_{n}, which has a non-zero radius of convergence in the complex plane, and within it represents an analytic function that is in fact an algebraic function. Then Eisenstein's theorem states that there exists a non-zero integer A, such that A^{n+1}a_{n} are all integers.

This has an interpretation in terms of p-adic numbers: with an appropriate extension of the idea, the p-adic radius of convergence of the series is at least 1, for almost all p (i.e., the primes outside a finite set S). In fact that statement is a little weaker, in that it disregards any initial partial sum of the series, in a way that may vary according to p. For the other primes the radius is non-zero.

== History ==
Eisenstein's original paper is the short communication Über eine allgemeine Eigenschaft der Reihen-Entwicklungen aller algebraischen Funktionen (1852), reproduced in Mathematische Gesammelte Werke, Band II, Chelsea Publishing Co., New York, 1975, p. 765–767.

More recently, many authors have investigated precise and effective bounds quantifying the above almost all. See, e.g., Sections 11.4 and 11.55 of the book by E. Bombieri & W. Gubler.
