= Rational reciprocity law =

Number theory concept

In number theory, a rational reciprocity law is a reciprocity law involving residue symbols that are related by a factor of +1 or –1 rather than a general root of unity.

As an example, there are rational biquadratic and octic reciprocity laws. Define the symbol (x|p)_{k} to be +1 if x is a k-th power modulo the prime p and -1 otherwise.

Let p and q be distinct primes congruent to 1 modulo 4, such that (p|q)_{2} = (q|p)_{2} = +1. Let p = a^{2} + b^{2} and q = A^{2} + B^{2} with aA odd. Then

$$(p|q)_4 (q|p)_4 = (-1)^{(q-1)/4} (aB-bA|q)_2 \ .$$

If in addition p and q are congruent to 1 modulo 8, let p = c^{2} + 2d^{2} and q = C^{2} + 2D^{2}. Then

$$(p|q)_8 = (q|p)_8 = (aB-bA|q)_4 (cD-dC|q)_2 \ .$$
