= Gotthold Eisenstein =

German mathematician (1823–1852)

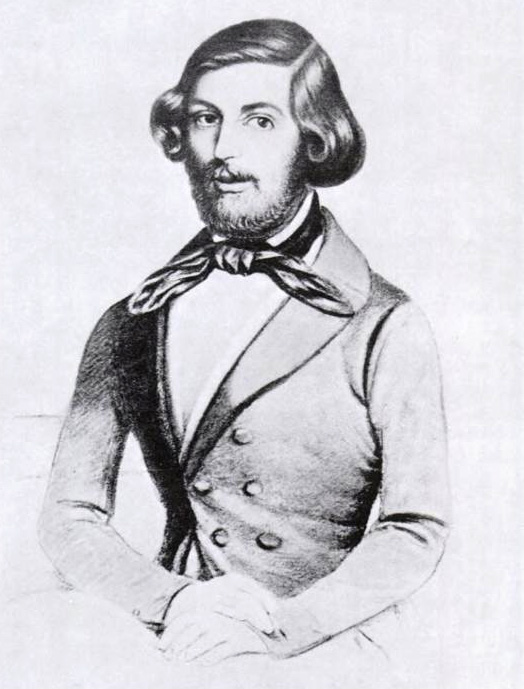
- Gotthold Eisenstein
- Born: 16 April 1823; Berlin, Prussia
- Died: 11 October 1852 (aged 29); Berlin, Prussia
- Education: University of Berlin
- Known for: Eisenstein's criterion
- Scientific career
- Fields: Mathematics
- Academic advisors: Ernst Eduard Kummer; Nikolaus Wolfgang Fischer

Ferdinand Gotthold Max Eisenstein (16 April 1823 – 11 October 1852) was a German mathematician who made significant contributions to number theory and analysis. Born in Berlin, Prussia, to Jewish parents who converted to Protestantism before his birth, Eisenstein displayed exceptional mathematical talent from a young age.

== Early life and education ==
Despite suffering from health problems, including meningitis, Eisenstein excelled academically. At 14, he attended Friedrich Werder Gymnasium. By age 15, he had mastered the mathematics curriculum. His teachers recognized his mathematical abilities, one quoted as saying:

His knowledge of mathematics goes far beyond the scope of the secondary school curriculum. His talent and zeal lead one to expect that some day he will make an important contribution to the development and expansion of science.

He then turned to the works of Leonhard Euler and Joseph-Louis Lagrange to study differential calculus.

While still a student, Eisenstein began attending lectures by Peter Gustav Lejeune Dirichlet and others at the University of Berlin. In 1843, he met William Rowan Hamilton in Dublin, who introduced him to Niels Henrik Abel's proof of the impossibility of solving fifth-degree polynomials, sparking his interest in mathematical research.

== Contributions to mathematics (1843-1848) ==
Upon returning to Berlin in 1843, Eisenstein passed his graduation exams and enrolled in the University. Within a year, he presented his first work on cubic forms in two variables to the Berlin Academy. He also gained the patronage of Alexander von Humboldt, who secured grants to support Eisenstein's financial needs.

During this period, Eisenstein published numerous papers in Crelle's Journal, including two proofs of the law of quartic reciprocity and analogous laws for cubic and quartic reciprocity. He also visited Carl Friedrich Gauss in Göttingen and received an honorary doctorate from the University of Breslau. In 1847, Eisenstein habilitated at the University of Berlin and began teaching there.

== Challenges and continued research ==
Despite his revolutionary activities in Berlin, which led to a brief imprisonment in 1848, Eisenstein continued his mathematical research. He made significant contributions to quadratic partitions of prime numbers and the reciprocity laws. His work was recognized by his election to the Academy of Göttingen and Berlin in 1851 and 1852, respectively.

== Illness and death ==
Eisenstein succumbed to tuberculosis at the age of 29. Alexander von Humboldt, a lifelong supporter, accompanied his remains to the cemetery.

== Publications ==
- Eisenstein, Gotthold (1847), Mathematische Abhandlungen. Besonders aus dem Gebiete der höheren Arithmetik und der elliptischen Funktionen (in German), Reimer, Berlin
- Eisenstein, Gotthold (1975), Mathematische Werke (in German), New York: AMS Chelsea Publishing, ISBN 978-0-8284-1280-3, MR 0427029 Weil's review

== Eponymous concepts ==
- Eisenstein's criterion
- Eisenstein ideal
- Eisenstein integer
- Eisenstein prime
- Eisenstein reciprocity
- Eisenstein sum
- Eisenstein series
- Eisenstein's theorem
- Eisenstein triple
- Eisenstein–Kronecker number
- Real analytic Eisenstein series

== See also ==
- Elliptic Gauss sum
