= List of École normale supérieure people =

Here follows a list of notable alumni and faculty of the École normale supérieure.

The term used in ENS slang for an alumnus is Archicube.

== Alumni ==
The year when they entered the ENS is in parentheses.

=== Nobel laureates ===
- Henri Bergson (1878) (1927 Nobel Prize in Literature)
- Claude Cohen-Tannoudji (1953) (1997 Nobel Prize in Physics)
- Pierre-Gilles de Gennes (1951) (1991 Nobel Prize in Physics)
- Gérard Debreu (1941) (1983 Bank of Sweden Prize in Economic Sciences in Memory of Alfred Nobel)
- Albert Fert (1957) (2007 Nobel Prize in Physics)
- Serge Haroche (1963) (2012 Nobel Prize in Physics)
- Alfred Kastler (1921) (1966 Nobel Prize in Physics)
- Gabriel Lippmann (1868) (1908 Nobel Prize in Physics)
- Louis Néel (1924) (1970 Nobel Prize in Physics)
- Jean-Baptiste Perrin (1891) (1926 Nobel Prize in Physics)
- Romain Rolland (1886) (1915 Nobel Prize in Literature)
- Paul Sabatier (1874) (1912 Nobel Prize in Chemistry)
- Jean-Paul Sartre (1924) (declined 1964 Nobel Prize in Literature)
- Esther Duflo (2019 Nobel Prize in Economics)

=== Fields Medal laureates ===
The following Fields Medal recipients were educated at the École Normale Supérieure.

- Laurent Schwartz (1934): 1950 Fields Medalist
- Jean-Pierre Serre (1945): 1954 Fields Medalist
- René Thom (1943): 1958 Fields Medalist
- Alain Connes (1966): 1982 Fields Medalist
- Jean-Christophe Yoccoz (1975): 1994 Fields Medalist
- Pierre-Louis Lions (1975): 1994 Fields Medalist
- Laurent Lafforgue (1986): 2002 Fields Medalist
- Wendelin Werner (1987): 2006 Fields Medalist
- Cédric Villani (1992): 2010 Fields Medalist
- Ngô Bảo Châu (1992): 2010 Fields Medalist
- Hugo Duminil-Copin (2006): 2022 Fields Medalist

=== Sciences ===
==== Chemistry ====
- David Zitoun (1999)
- Anna Fischer (2003)

==== Medicine and biology ====
- Stanislas Dehaene (1984), current Chair of Experimental Psychology at the Collège de France
- Charles Chamberland, microbiologist, Known for Chamberland filter
- Jean-Pierre Changeux, neuroscientist
- Louis Pasteur (1843), chemist and microbiologist, confirmed the germ theory of disease

==== Physics ====
- Édouard Branly (1865)
- Léon Brillouin
- Marcel Brillouin (1878)
- Monique Combescure
- Hubert Curien (1945)
- Thomas Fink
- Jean Baptiste Joseph Fourier
- Paul Langevin (1894)
- Yves Rocard (1922)
- Georges Sagnac (1889)
- Eugene Bloch
- Hamdy Doweidar

==== Mathematics ====
- Nalini Anantharaman (1994)
- Roger Apéry (1936)
- Paul Emile Appell (1872)
- Cahit Arf (1932)
- Denis Auroux (1995)
- René-Louis Baire (1892)
- Arnaud Beauville (1966)
- Marcel Berger (1948)
- Pierre Berthelot (1962)
- Philippe Biane (1981)
- Émile Borel (1889)
- Louis Boutet de Monvel (1960)
- Emmanuel Breuillard (1997)
- Marcel Brillouin (1874)
- Jean-Luc Brylinski (1971)
- François Bruhat (1948)
- Élie Cartan (1888)
- Henri Cartan (1923), co-founder of Bourbaki
- Pierre Cartier (1950)
- Claude Chevalley (1926), co-founder of Bourbaki
- Gustave Choquet (1934)
- Henri Cohen (1966)
- Yves Colin de Verdière (1964)
- Jean-Louis Colliot-Thélène (1966)
- Pierre Colmez (1981)
- Alain Connes (1966)
- Thierry Coquand (1980)
- Antoine Augustin Cournot (1821)
- Louis Couturat (1887)
- Jean Gaston Darboux (1891)
- Georges Darmois (1906)
- Patrick Dehornoy (1971)
- Jean Delsarte (1922), co-founder of Bourbaki
- Michel Demazure (1955)
- Arnaud Denjoy (1902)
- Jean Dieudonné (1924), co-founder of Bourbaki
- Jacques Dixmier (1942)
- Pierre Dolbeault (1944)
- Adrien Douady (1954)
- Paul Dubreil (1923)
- Marie-Louise Dubreil-Jacotin (1926)
- Hugo Duminil-Copin (2005)
- Charles Ehresmann (1927), co-founder of Bourbaki
- Ivar Ekeland (1963)
- Nicole El Karoui (1964)
- Hélène Esnault (1973)
- Pierre Fatou (1898)
- Jacqueline Ferrand (1936)
- Étienne Fouvry (1972)
- Maurice René Fréchet (1900)
- Évariste Galois (1829), originated Galois theory
- René Gateaux (1907)
- Roger Godement (1940)
- François Golse (1981)
- Édouard Goursat (1876)
- Alice Guionnet (1989)
- Jacques Hadamard (1884)
- Guy Henniart (1973)
- Jacques Herbrand (1925)
- Luc Illusie (1959)
- Hervé Jacquet (1959)
- Gaston Julia (1911)
- Max Karoubi (1959)
- Fanny Kassel (2003)
- Jean-Louis Koszul (1940)
- François Labourie (1980)
- Vincent Lafforgue (1992)
- Gérard Laumon (1972)
- Jean-François Le Gall (1978)
- Henri Lebesgue (1894)
- Pierre Lelong (1931)
- Jean Leray (1926)
- André Lichnerowicz (1933)
- Jacques-Louis Lions (1950)
- François Loeser (1978)
- Édouard Lucas (1861)
- Bernard Malgrange (1947)
- Frank Merle (1982)
- Loïc Merel (1986)
- Paul-André Meyer (1954)
- Yves Meyer (1957)
- Paul Montel (1894)
- Sophie Morel (1999)
- André Néron (1943)
- Joseph Oesterlé (1973)
- Patrice Ossona de Mendez (1986)
- Henri Padé (1883)
- Paul Painlevé (1883)
- Bernadette Perrin-Riou (1974)
- Mihailo Petrović (1890)
- Charles Émile Picard (1874)
- Vincent Pilloni (2002)
- Charles Pisot (1929)
- Georges Poitou (1945)
- René de Possel (1923), co-founder of Bourbaki
- Victor Puiseux (1837)
- Michel Raynaud (1958)
- Raphaël Rouquier (1988)
- Laure Saint-Raymond (1994)
- Pierre Samuel (1940)
- Marie-Hélène Schwartz (1934)
- Sylvia Serfaty (1994)
- Jean-Claude Sikorav (1976)
- Christophe Soulé (1970)
- Jean-Marie Souriau (1942)
- Gheorghe Tzitzeica (1896)
- Jean-Louis Verdier (1955)
- Ernest Vessiot (1884)
- Paul Vidal de la Blache (1863), considered the founder of French modern geography
- Claire Voisin (1981)
- Jean-Loup Waldspurger (1972)
- André Weil (1922), co-founder of Bourbaki
- Jean-Pierre Wintenberger (1973)
- Nicușor Daniel Dan (1992), president of Romania

=== Humanities ===
- Jean Bousquet (1931), classicist, archaeologist (Delphi excavations), Director of ENS
- François Déroche, orientalist, islamologist, and specialist in Codicology and Palaeography

==== Philosophy ====
- Louis Althusser (1939), Marxist philosopher
- Raymond Aron (1924), political philosopher, founder of French conservative thought post-1960
- Alain Badiou, philosopher
- Étienne Balibar (1960), philosopher and linguist
- Simone de Beauvoir (1924), philosopher, novelist
- Gustave Belot (1878), philosopher
- Georges Canguilhem (1924), philosopher of science
- Jean Cavaillès (1923), philosopher and Résistance hero
- Emile Auguste Chartier "Alain" (1889), philosopher
- André Comte-Sponville (1972), philosopher and essayist
- Victor Cousin (1810), spiritualist philosopher and historian of philosophy
- Jacques Derrida (1952), founder of deconstruction
- Michel Foucault (1946), historian of systems of thought, member of Collège de France
- Georges Gusdorf (1933), philosopher and historian of ideas
- Jean Hyppolite (1924), founder of Hegelian studies in France
- Vladimir Jankélévitch (1922), philosopher, musicologist
- Quentin Meillassoux, philosopher
- Maurice Merleau-Ponty (1926), phenomenologist
- Jacques Rancière (1960), philosopher
- Philippe-Joseph Salazar (1975), rhetorician, member of College international de philosophie
- Jean-Paul Sartre (1924), philosopher, novelist, playwright, journalist
- Hippolyte Taine (1893)
- Simone Weil (1928), philosopher and mystic

==== Sociology ====
- Jean-Michel Berthelot (1966)
- Raymond Boudon (1951)
- Pierre Bourdieu (1951)
- Émile Durkheim (1879), considered the founder of French sociology

==== Literature ====
- Paul Bénichou (1927)
- Robert Brasillach, novelist, critic and pro-Nazi collaborationist
- Aimé Césaire (1935), poet and politician
- Marie Darrieussecq (1990), novelist
- Assia Djebar (1955), Algerian novelist and filmmaker
- Jean Giraudoux (1903), playwright
- Julien Gracq (1930), novelist and literary critic
- Sabiha Al Khemir (1982), writer, illustrator and expert in Islamic art
- Édouard Louis (2011), novelist and sociologist
- Paul Nizan (1924)
- Charles Péguy (1894), poet
- Claude Ribbe (1974), historian and novelist
- Romain Rolland (1886), novelist
- Jules Romains (1906), novelist
- Éric-Emmanuel Schmitt (1980)

==== Literary criticism ====
- Jean-Charles Darmon (1982)
- Gérard Genette (1951)
- Jean-Pierre Richard (1941)

==== Philology, grammar, linguistics ====
- Anatole Bailly (1853), hellenist
- Jean Bousquet (1931), hellenist
- Michel Bréal (1852), philologist
- Jérôme Carcopino (1901), specialist of Roman Antiquity
- Jacqueline de Romilly (1933), hellenist, specialist of the history and literature of Ancient Greece
- Antoine Culioli (1944), linguist
- Oswald Ducrot (1949), linguist, specialist of pragmatics
- Georges Dumézil (1916), philologist, linguist, caucasianist, specialist of Proto-Indo-European language and society
- Alexandre François (1992), linguist, specialist of Oceanic languages
- Numa Denis Fustel de Coulanges (1850), specialist of classical and mediaeval history
- Marcel Granet (1904), sinologist
- Pierre Grimal (1933), Latinist
- Claude Hagège (1955), linguist
- Catherine Kerbrat-Orecchioni (1963), linguist, specialist of pragmatics
- Charles de Lamberterie, specialist of Armenian and comparative linguistics of Indo-European languages
- Gilbert Lazard (1940), linguist, iranologist
- Christiane Marchello-Nizia (1961), specialist of Old French
- Alain Rouveret (1968), syntactician
- Andrey Zaliznyak (1957), Soviet exchange student, linguist

==== History ====
- Marc Bloch (1904), co-founder of the Annales School
- Lucien Febvre (1899), co-founder of the Annales School
- Henri Hauser (1885), economic historian
- Ernest Lavisse (1862), a founder of Positivist history
- Jacques Le Goff (1945), medievalist
- Emmanuel Le Roy Ladurie (1949), historian
- Neil MacGregor, art historian, Director of the British Museum
- Paul Mantoux (1894), economic historian
- Jacques Soustelle (1929), ethnologist
- Gilbert Dagron (1953), historian

==== Economics ====
- Yves Balasko (1964)
- Esther Duflo (1992)
- Emmanuel Farhi (1997)
- Xavier Gabaix (1991)
- Thomas Piketty (1989)
- Emmanuel Saez (1992)
- Christian Morrisson (1957)
- Jean-Charles Asselain (1962)

==== Government and public policy ====
- Léon Blum (1890) (expelled during his third year), first Socialist Prime Minister of France (1936)
- Pierre Brossolette (1922), politician and resistant
- Laurent Fabius (1966), Prime Minister of France, 1984-1986
- Édouard Herriot (1891), Prime Minister of France, 1924–1925, 1926 and 1932
- Jean Jaurès (1878), Socialist leader
- Alain Juppé (1964), Prime Minister of France 1995-1997
- Bruno Le Maire (1989), Minister of the Economy, 2017-present; Minister of Agriculture 2009-2012
- Benny Lévy (1965), founder of Gauche prolétarienne
- Paul Painlevé (1883), mathematician; Prime Minister of France in 1917 and 1925
- Georges Pompidou (1931), Prime Minister of France 1962–1968; President of France 1969-1974
- Michel Sapin (1974), Finance Minister 1992–1993; Minister of Civil Servants and State Reforms 2000-2002
- Pierre Uri, economist and architect of the European Economic Community
- Laurent Wauquiez (1994), President of The Republicans, 2017–present; Minister of Higher Education 2011-2012

==== Business ====
- Philippe Camus (1967), Chairman of Alcatel Lucent
- Isabelle Kocher (1987), CEO of Engie
- Anne Lauvergeon (1978), former President of Areva
- Jean-Charles Naouri (1967), CEO of Groupe Casino

== Faculty ==
- Louis Althusser
- Alain Badiou
- Samuel Beckett, 1969 Nobel Prize in Literature
- Pierre Bonnet
- Paul Celan
- John Coates
- Victor Cousin
- Numa Denis Fustel de Coulanges
- Jacques Derrida
- Alfred Des Cloizeaux
- Laurent Freidel
- Michael Ghil
- Jacques Lacan
- Ernest Lavisse
- Alfred Kastler, 1966 Nobel Prize in Physics
- Thomas MacGreevy
- Jacqueline de Romilly
- Jean-Pierre Serre, 1954 Fields Medal
- Michel Soutif, 1942
- Christian Lorenzi (2005), Professor of Experimental Psychology, he was a former director of the Department of Cognitive Studies and Director of Scientific Studies

== Sources ==
Dates of entrance at the ENS can be checked at https://web.archive.org/web/20071009092113/http://www.archicubes.ens.fr/
