= David Zitoun =

Israeli chemist and materials scientist

- דוד זיתון
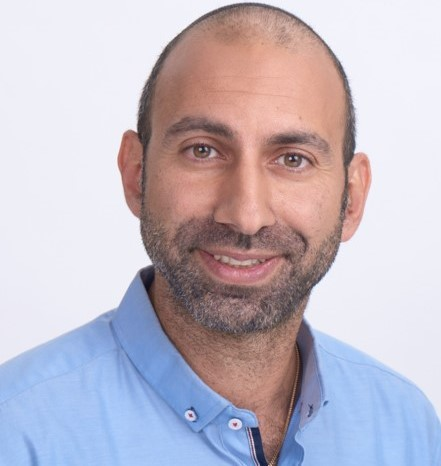
- Born: June 29, 1975; France
- Citizenship: Israeli
- Education: University Toulouse III
- Scientific career
- Fields: Chemistry, Nano-materials
- Workplaces: Bar Ilan University
- Doctoral advisor: Bruno Chaudret
- Other academic advisors: Peidong Yang (University of California, Berkeley)

David Zitoun (Hebrew: דוד זיתון) is an Israeli chemist and materials scientist.

== Biography ==
David Zitoun obtained his M.Sc. (1999) in Physical chemistry from Ecole Normale Superieure, France, and a Ph.D. (2003) from the University Toulouse III, France, under the supervision of Bruno Chaudret, with a dissertation on the magnetism of clusters. In 2003 he was a Post-Doctoral Research Fellow at the University of California, Berkeley with Prof. Peidong Yang, investigating the diluted magnetic semiconducting nanowires. Between 2004 and 2009 he was a senior lecturer at Montpellier 2 University, France, and in 2009 he joined the Department of Chemistry at Bar-Ilan University (BIU) where he is currently a full professor and holds the position of the Head of the department. Zitoun is a member of the Bar-Ilan Institute for Nanotechnology and Advanced Materials (BINA), a member of the Israel National Research Center for Electrochemical Propulsion (INREP), an associate editor of the Journal of Nanoparticle Research (Springer), a Panel Member of the FORMAS Funding Agency (Sweden), and an Expert for the Horizon 2020 research program. He has also been a consultant for ICL-IP, PVNanoCell, and CENS Materials.

== Scientific interests and publications ==
His current research focuses on the investigation of the chemical synthesis of materials to promote renewable and green energies. Zitoun's lab has a high expertise in the wet synthesis of Nano-scale materials with the accent on the transition metals, their complexes, organometallic, metallic, and metal-oxide compounds. He developed new chemical routes using soluble organometallic or metal-organic precursors as an alternative to conventional colloidal chemistry and gas phase thin film deposition. The nanomaterials exhibit high activity for electrocatalysis in alkaline medium. Zitoun and colleagues were the first to introduce the use of electron magnetic measurements in post-mortem analyses of Li-ion batteries and the first group to publish the operando electron magnetic measurements. These in-situ measurements allowed proposing a new electrochemical mechanism for the high energy density anodic materials. David Zitoun has an active scientific collaboration with many world-renowned scientists, among which are Prof. Doron Aurbach, Prof. Zeev Zalevsky and Prof. Nicola Pinna.

== Personal life ==
David Zitoun is married to Keren Zitoun, a pharmacist with a thesis in music therapy. They immigrated to Israel in 2009 and have four children.
