= Jacques Tilouine =

- Education: Paris-Sud University
- Scientific career
- Fields: Mathematics
- Workplaces: Université Sorbonne Paris Nord
- Thesis: Autour de la conjecture principale anticyclotomique (1989)
- Doctoral advisor: John H. Coates
- Doctoral students: Vincent Pilloni; Eric Urban

Jacques Tilouine is a professor of mathematics at Université Sorbonne Paris Nord working in number theory and automorphic forms, particularly Iwasawa theory.

== Career ==
Tilouine received his PhD in mathematics from Paris-Sud University in 1989 under the supervision of John H. Coates. He is a professor of mathematics at Université Sorbonne Paris Nord.

== Research ==
Tilouine has worked on the anticyclotomic main conjecture of Iwasawa theory, special values of L-functions, and Serre-type conjectures for symplectic groups.

== Selected publications ==
- Harris, Michael; Tilouine, Jacques (2001). "p-adic measures and square roots of special values of triple product L-functions". Mathematische Annalen. 320 (1): 127–147. arXiv:math/9610228. doi:10.1007/PL00004465. ISSN 0025-5831. S2CID 123122384.
- Herzig, Florian; Tilouine, Jacques (2013). "Conjecture de type de Serre et formes compagnons pour GSp4". Journal für die reine und angewandte Mathematik. 2013 (676): 1–32. arXiv:0812.1525. doi:10.1515/CRELLE.2011.190. ISSN 1435-5345. S2CID 18101385.
- Hida, H.; Tilouine, J. (1994). "On the anticyclotomic main conjecture for CM fields". Inventiones Mathematicae. 117 (1): 89–147. Bibcode:1994InMat.117...89H. doi:10.1007/BF01232236. ISSN 0020-9910. S2CID 121368809.
- Tilouine, J. (1989). "Sur la conjecture principale anticyclotomique". Duke Mathematical Journal. 59 (3): 629–673. doi:10.1215/S0012-7094-89-05929-2. ISSN 0012-7094.
