= Vincent Pilloni =

French mathematician

- Education: Université Sorbonne Paris Nord; École Normale Supérieure
- Scientific career
- Fields: Mathematics
- Workplaces: CNRS; École normale supérieure de Lyon
- Thesis: Arithmétique des variétés de Siegel (2009)
- Doctoral advisor: Jacques Tilouine

Vincent Pilloni is a French mathematician, specializing in arithmetic geometry and the Langlands program.

== Career ==
Pilloni studied at the École Normale Supérieure and received his doctorate in 2009 from Université Sorbonne Paris Nord with thesis advisor Jacques Tilouine and thesis Arithmétique des variétés de Siegel.

His research deals with, among other topics, the question of how the modularity theorem for elliptic curves over the rational numbers (which led to the proof of Fermat's Last Theorem) can be extended to abelian varieties. With George Boxer, Frank Calegari and Toby Gee, he proved that all abelian surfaces and genus two curves over totally real fields are potentially modular and satisfy the Hasse-Weil conjecture.

Pilloni is a Chargé de recherche of CNRS at Paris-Saclay University based at the Institut de mathématique d'Orsay.

In 2018 he was an invited speaker, with Fabrizio Andreatta and Adrian Iovita, at the International Congress of Mathematicians in Rio de Janeiro. In 2018 Pilloni received the Prix Élie Cartan. In 2021 he was awarded the Fermat Prize.

== Selected publications ==
- Pilloni, Vincent (2012). "Sur la théorie de Hida pour le groupe $\textrm{GSp}_{2g}$". Bulletin de la Société mathématique de France. 140 (3). Societe Mathematique de France: 335–400. doi:10.24033/bsmf.2630. ISSN 0037-9484.
- Pilloni, Vincent (2012). "Modularité, formes de Siegel et surfaces abéliennes". Journal für die reine und angewandte Mathematik (Crelle's Journal). 2012 (666). Walter de Gruyter GmbH. doi:10.1515/crelle.2011.123. ISSN 1435-5345. S2CID 121162699.
- Pilloni, Vincent (15 March 2011). "Prolongement analytique sur les variétés de Siegel". Duke Mathematical Journal. 157 (1). Duke University Press. doi:10.1215/00127094-2011-004. ISSN 0012-7094.
- Bijakowski, Stéphane; Pilloni, Vincent; Stroh, Benoît (1 May 2016). "Classicité de formes modulaires surconvergentes". Annals of Mathematics. 183 (3): 975–1014. arXiv:1212.2035. doi:10.4007/annals.2016.183.3.5. ISSN 0003-486X. S2CID 55728265.
- Andreatta, Fabrizio; Iovita, Adrian; Pilloni, Vincent (1 March 2015). "p-adic families of Siegel modular cuspforms". Annals of Mathematics: 623–697. arXiv:1212.3812. doi:10.4007/annals.2015.181.2.5. ISSN 0003-486X. S2CID 54623621.
- Vincent Pilloni; Adrian Iovita; Fabrizio Andreatta (2018). "Le halo spectral". Annales scientifiques de l'École normale supérieure. 51 (3). Societe Mathematique de France: 603–655. doi:10.24033/asens.2362. hdl:11577/3287053. ISSN 0012-9593.
- Andreatta, Fabrizio; Iovita, Adrian; Pilloni, Vincent (2016). "On overconvergent Hilbert modular cusp forms" (PDF). Astérisque. 382: 163–193. MR 3581177.
- with Benoit Stroh: Surconvergence, ramification et modularité, Astérisque, vol. 382, 2016, pp. 195–266. MR
- Pilloni, Vincent (9 November 2016). "Formes modulaires p-adiques de Hilbert de poids 1". Inventiones Mathematicae. 208 (2). Springer Science and Business Media LLC: 633–676. doi:10.1007/s00222-016-0697-x. ISSN 0020-9910. S2CID 125123116.
