= Madeleine Chaumont =

French mathematics teacher

- Born: 8 April 1896; Poissy
- Died: 27 July 1973 (aged 77); Le Kremlin-Bicêtre
- Resting place: Montparnasse cemetery
- Education: Collège Sévigné, Lycée Chaptal
- Occupations: Mathematician, Teacher
- Known for: Activist in education
- Parents: Alfred Chaumont (father); Hélène Chaumont (mother)

Madeleine Chaumont (8 April 1896 – 27 July 1973) was a French mathematics teacher, who was notable as one of the first 41 women to be admitted to the École normale supérieure, and the second woman to be awarded the male agrégation in mathematics. Throughout her life, her teaching career was disrupted by various health problems.

== Life ==
Chaumont was the daughter of Alfred Chaumont, director of the Chaumont Frères distillery, and Hélène Chaumont, a pianist. Having contracted several ear infections as a child, she suffered from hearing problems all her life.

A student at the Collège Sévigné, she obtained her Baccalauréat in mathematics and philosophy in 1912 and 1913. After a brief spell in preparatory classes at the Lycée Chaptal, she obtained a degree in mathematics. Encouraged by her former teacher at Chaptal, Alexandre Bernheim, and by the success of Marguerite Rouvière and Georgette Parize in the competitive examination for the École Normale Supérieure, she decided to apply in 1919; she was accepted, but had to make do with the status of bachelor's scholarship holder. It was not until 1927 that a decree issued by Édouard Herriot granted her the title of former student of the École normale supérieure. She was thus one of the 41 female students at the École before the competitive examination was banned in 1939.

She stayed at the school for only one year, to prepare for the men's agrégation in mathematics in 1920. Chaumont obtained it in 1920, in first place; she was the first female laureate since Liouba Bortniker in 1885. She demanded that "young girls should not have the right, but the obligation, to take the agrégation in boys' high schools", and she spoke out in favour of abolishing the women's agrégation, which was not achieved until 1976, after her death.

== Career ==
In September 1920, she was assigned to the girls' high school in Reims, where she demanded equal treatment with her male colleagues. Unanimously praised for her pedagogical qualities, she was nevertheless regularly absent due to health problems. In 1927, she moved to the Lycée de Jeunes Filles de Versailles, where she prepared for the competitive examination for the École Normale Supérieure de Jeunes Filles, and then in 1933 to the Lycée Fénelon. Her pupils' applications were regularly successful.

Chaumont moved to Limoges in 1939–40, she was excluded from teaching in October 1941 in application of the Second law on the status of Jews and had to wear the yellow star. She was replaced by her former colleague from the Ecole Normale Supérieure, François Deschamps, who sent her pupils for private lessons.

She was reinstated at Fénelon in October 1944, and regularly received praise from the Inspectors General and her headmistress; again, many of her students were successful. From 1955 onwards, however, it had to face the reservations of the new headmistress and competition from the new special mathematics class at the Lycée Jules-Ferry. After a drastic fall in its numbers, the Fénelon class was closed in 1956. Appointed to the Centre national d'enseignement à distance because of her health problems, she prepared for the CAPES and the agrégation, but fell victim to overwork and missed the contact with her students1. In 1958, she obtained an appointment in elementary mathematics at the Lycée Claude-Monet, but the number of pupils fell again and she provoked an outcry. After much pressure, she retired in October of the same year. However, she continued to teach a course at the Institut Catholique de Paris until 1963. In 1971, she again gave lessons to a candidate at the École Polytechnique. All in all, during her career, she played "a decisive role in the access of women to quality scientific education".

Chaumont was woman of culture, who remained close to her cousin Geneviève Cahn, wife of Germain Debré, and a pianist like her own mother. Having entered a retirement home in Châtenay-Malabry, she died on 27 July 1973 at the hospital in Châtenay-Malabry, aged 77, following a fracture of the neck of the femur. She was cremated in the Père-Lachaise cemetery and her ashes were placed in the tomb of her sister and brother-in-law in the Montparnasse cemetery.
