= Hugo Aguilaniu =

21st-century French geneticist

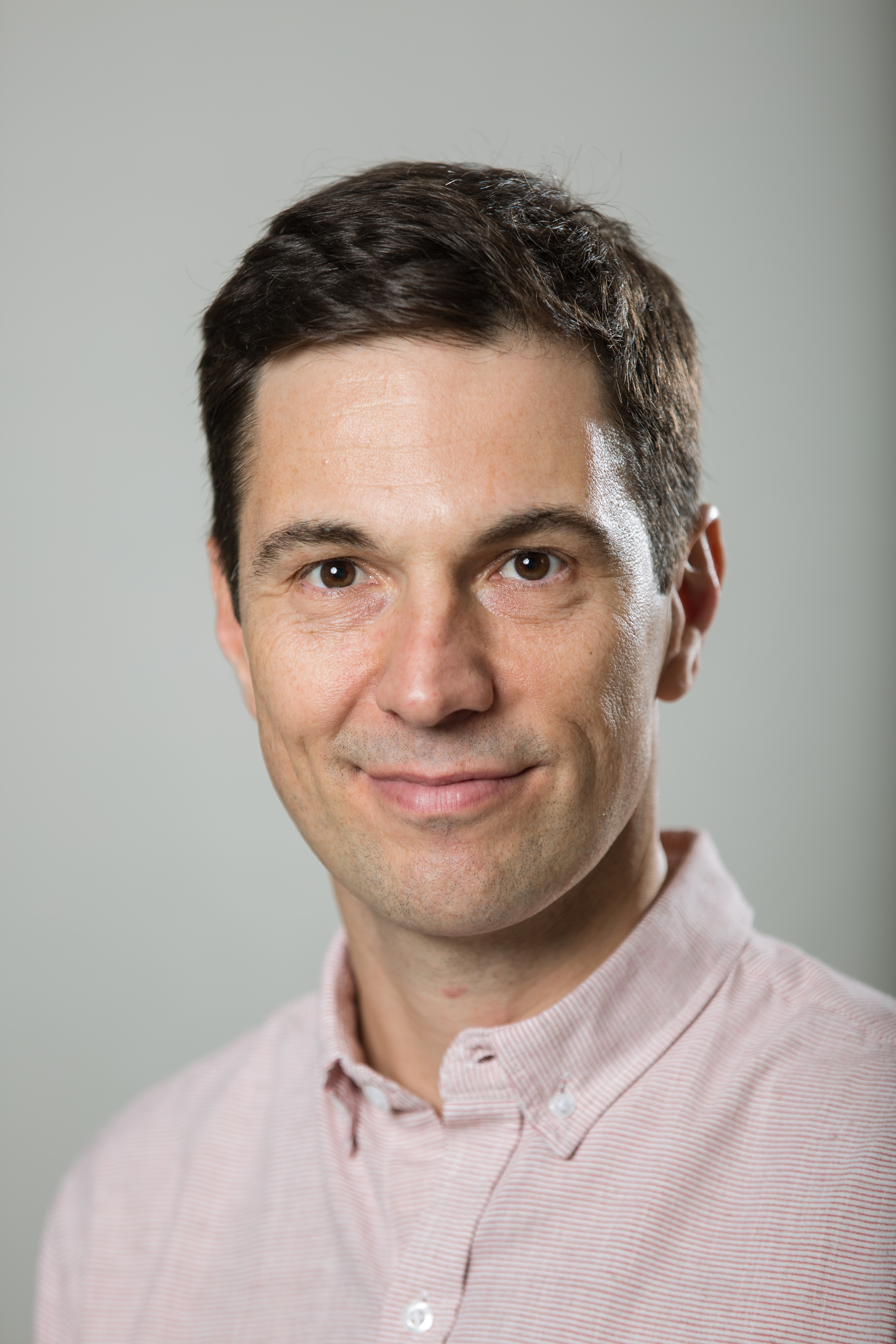
- Aguilaniu in 2024
- Born: 4 October 1975 (age 51); Grenoble, France
- Title: Executive Director of Instituto Serrapilheira
- Awards: CNRS Bronze Medal (2015); ERC Consolidator Grant (2015)

Academic background
- Education: Chalmers University of Technology; Salk Institute for Biological Studies
- Thesis: On protein oxidation, lifespan and aging in Saccharomyces cerevisiae (2003)
- Academic advisor: Thomas Nyström

Academic work
- Discipline: Molecular genetics
- Sub-discipline: Genetics of ageing
- Institutions: Instituto Serrapilheira (since 2017); École Normale Supérieure de Lyon (2007–2017); CNRS (2006–2017)

Hugo Aguilaniu (born 4 October 1975) is a French geneticist whose research focuses on the molecular mechanisms of aging. He has been the executive director of the Instituto Serrapilheira in Brazil since 2017.

== Biography ==
Aguilaniu was born in Grenoble, France in 1975 and trained as an agronomist in Bordeaux. In 2003 he obtained his PhD on the molecular genetics of the ageing process from Chalmers University of Technology in Sweden under the supervision of Thomas Nyström, Lena Gustafsson, and Michel Rigoulet.

He then was a postdoctoral fellow at the Salk Institute for Biological Studies (La Jolla, United States) from 2003 to 2006 in Andrew Dillin's lab working on the caloric restriction response in Caenorhabditis elegans. In 2006, he joined the CNRS and became a research director in 2015. At the École Normale Supérieure de Lyon, he started his own team working on the biology of aging, using experimental models such as the yeast Saccharomyces cerevisiae and the nematode Caenorhabditis elegans. His work has examined, in particular, how nutrition affects reproduction and aging. In 2015, he received the CNRS Bronze Medal and an ERC Consolidator Grant.

Aguilaniu's research addresses the genetics of the aging process. He has co-authored studies on the asymmetric inheritance of oxidatively damaged proteins during cell division in yeast, their elimination during reproduction in C. elegans, and the genetic determinants of dietary restriction in that organism.

=== Instituto Serrapilheira ===
In 2017, Aguilaniu was appointed to lead the Instituto Serrapilheira in Rio de Janeiro, an organization dedicated to supporting scientific research and the public communication of science in Brazil. He has published analyses on strategic issues in research funding and the role of science philanthropy in times of political crisis. He has also emphasized that philanthropy cannot replace public funding, which he describes as the backbone of research financing.

== Selected publications ==
- Aguilaniu, Hugo; Gustafsson, Lena; Rigoulet, Michel; Nyström, Thomas (2003). "Asymmetric inheritance of oxidatively damaged proteins during cytokinesis". Science. 299 (5613).
- Goudeau, Jérôme; Aguilaniu, Hugo (2010). "Carbonylated proteins are eliminated during reproduction in C. elegans". Aging Cell. 9 (6): 991–1003.
- Panowski, Siler H.; Wolff, Suzanne; Aguilaniu, Hugo; Durieux, Jenni; Dillin, Andrew (2007). "PHA-4/Foxa mediates diet-restriction-induced longevity of C. elegans". Nature. 447 (7144): 550–555.
- Thondamal, Manjunatha; Witting, Michael; Schmitt-Kopplin, Philippe (2014). "Steroid hormone signalling links reproduction to lifespan in dietary-restricted Caenorhabditis elegans". Nature Communications. 5 (4879). et al.
