= Ellen Eischen =

American mathematician

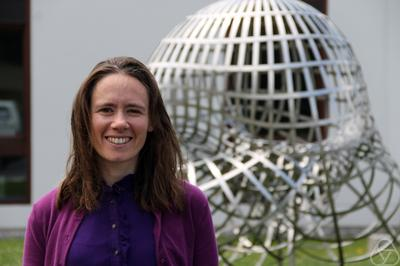
Eischen at Oberwolfach in 2014

Ellen Elizabeth Eischen (born 1979) is an American mathematician specializing in number theory, and especially in the analytic, geometric, and algebraic properties of automorphic forms and L-functions. She is a professor of mathematics at the University of Oregon and a von Neumann Fellow at the Institute for Advanced Study.

Beyond mathematics research, Eischen has also popularized mathematical visualization and creativity through an exhibit at the Jordan Schnitzer Museum of Art that became "the museum’s most visited virtual exhibit of all time".

== Education and career ==
Eischen graduated from Princeton University in 2003. She completed a Ph.D. at the University of Michigan in 2009, with the dissertation $p$-adic Differential Operators on Automorphic Forms and Applications supervised by Christopher Skinner.

She became a Ralph Boas Assistant Professor at Northwestern University from 2009 to 2012, and an assistant professor at the University of North Carolina at Chapel Hill from 2012 to 2015, before moving to the University of Oregon in 2015. She was promoted to associate professor in 2017 and full professor in 2023. She is a von Neumann Fellow at the Institute for Advanced Study for 2024–2025.

== Recognition ==
Eischen was named as a 2024 Fellow of the Association for Women in Mathematics, "for her outstanding leadership in support of women in mathematics; for her sustained efforts to create new research opportunities for women at conferences, including at APAW, AWM, WIN, and MSRI/SLMath; and for her innovative approach to creating diverse communities in math with an AWM reading room and math art exhibits". She was elected as a Fellow of the American Mathematical Society, in the 2025 class of fellows.
