= Marguerite Rouvière =

French physicist

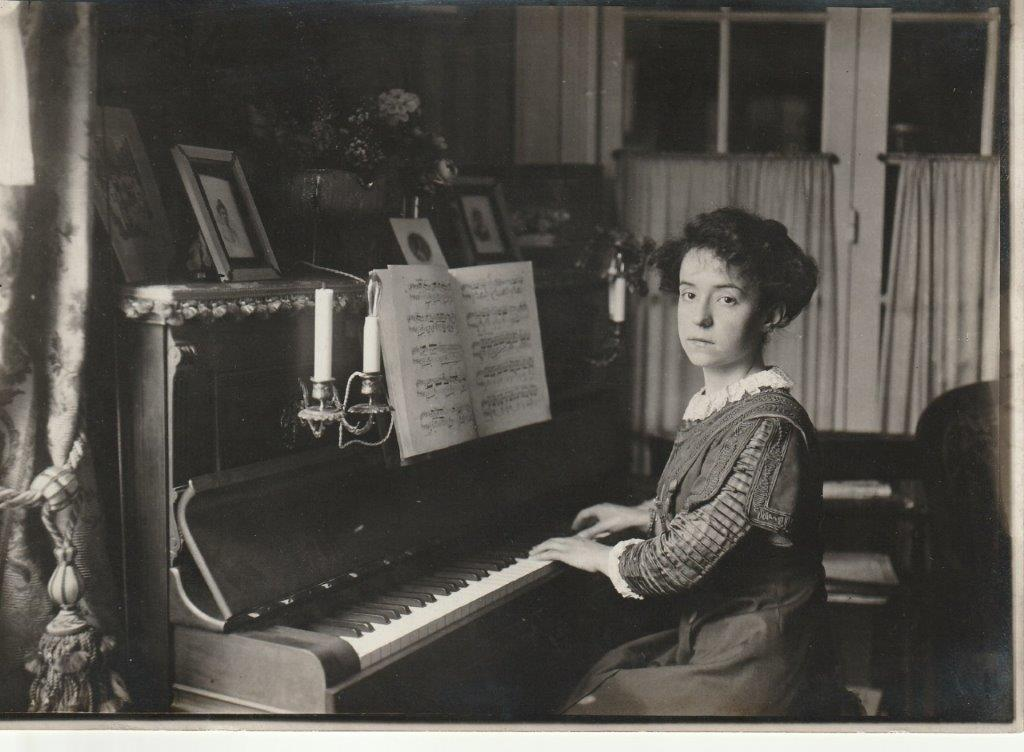

Marguerite Marie Charlotte Rouvière (27 June 1889 – 30 January 1966) was a French physicist, teacher and translator, a pioneer for women in French science as student, teacher and union member.

== Biography ==
She was born in Pertuis, Vaucluse, in the Provence-Alpes-Côte d'Azur region and was known as "Magali" to her family. She was the eldest of three daughters of Lucie Marie Joséphine Maurizot and Émile Rouvière, an army administrator with the rank of artillery lieutenant, a former student of one of the Grandes écoles, the École Polytechnique known as l'X, and a knight of the Legion of Honour.

In 1908, she achieved her fr:Certificat d'études supérieures préparatoires (English: Graduate preparatory certificate) in physics, chemistry and natural sciences with good honours. In 1910, she became the first woman to be accepted at another of the Grandes écoles, the highly selective and prestigious École Normale Supérieure of Rue d'Ulm Street (ENS) after her case was discussed and her enrolment confirmed by the fr:Conseil supérieur de l'Instruction publique. On her behalf, her egalitarian father had asked the director of the ENS - the celebrated historian Ernest Lavisse - to allow her entry. It was agreed, the administration having discussed prior successes of two other young women in mathematics and natural sciences, Liouba Bortniker and Marie Robert respectively (Rouvière's sister, Jeanne, enrolled two years later). In 1913, she followed this by becoming the first female winner of the fr:Agrégation de sciences physiques, a competition for the recruitment of teachers for schools and universities: successful students of the school are regarded as civil servants. She undertook a doctoral scholarship for two years, unencumbered by the wartime obligations of the male students.

Her studentship at the ENS had been reported nationally with contrary attitudes. The front page of Le Matin - illustrated with a photograph of Rouvière - bore the headline, "La première taupine de France." [Taupe is ENS argot for a student of preparatory science courses, hence the feminine form, taupine]. It stated that here was a young woman whose drive bypassed the expected frivolities of youth towards "transcendental mathematics." Conversely, she was scoffed at in Femina - a conservative and bourgeois-leaning women's magazine - which claimed that out of over a thousand women interviewed, most did not approve of her presence there. Femina included a photograph of the three Rouvière sisters - Marguerite, Jeanne and Madeleine - and commented on her sister, Jeanne, who was aiming to go to the Lycée Buffon, that "more than one pupil would find 'the teacher' more attractive than the subjects." (Jeanne spent two years at Lycée Buffon and afterwards published a translation of Albert Einstein's special and general theories of relativity). At the ENS itself, initial surprise among many gave way to curiosity and interest towards a "balanced and intelligent girl." She was supported by practising catholics there. However, as an ENS existed for young women at Sèvres, some considered that she was therefore taking the place of a young man, without having to do national service. A number of teaching staff bemoaned Rouvière's inclusion, including Henri Abraham, the professor of Physics (later to be killed in Auschwitz concentration camp) who excoriated her about a [quite accurate] statement she made on a difficult topic, leaving her in tears. In this environment, she was helped by her colleague, Jean Rivière, whom she later married.

She was only able to claim "licence holder" status as a woman [statut de boursière de licence] from her time at the ENS - for example, she could not teach in a boys' school or be entitled to a pension until a ministerial decree of 1927. She translated into French the work of father-and-son Nobel-prize winners William Henry Bragg and William Lawrence Bragg, X-Rays and Crystal Structure, and that of the discoverer of the eponymous Lyman series of ultraviolet emission lines Theodore Lyman, The Spectroscopy of the Extreme Ultra-Violet. She was scientific editor of a French translation of Frank E. Weston's Practical Manual of Organic Analysis.

She married Jean Rivière (born 18 May 1889) on 17 October 1916. He was the son of a librarian from Douai and became a naval engineer and then a researcher for the French National Centre for Scientific Research (CNRS). She gave up teaching during motherhood. She had three children, Jacques (1918), Michel (1924) and Danielle (1927). Jacques enrolled at ENS in 1939 but became ill. Rouvière asked to be reassigned from the Lycée Fénelon, Paris, to Marseille or Grenoble during his recovery (he'd gone to Marseille, where his father worked) and was finally employed at Aix-en-Provence. When Jacques got better he resumed his studies in Marseille, and Rouvière was reinstated in her Paris job. However, Jacques died in July 1943, and she was assigned a less demanding role at the Lycée et collège Victor-Duruy.

As a teacher, from April to July 1915, she worked at the Lycée Pasteur (Neuilly-sur-Seine) for eight hours per week. Through the remainder of 1915 and 1916 she taught Physics without full teaching status for six hours weekly at Lycée Carnot in Paris. She was a teacher for scientific preparatory work - that is for the same competitive state scientific environment she succeeded in - at the boys' high school in Toulon for entry to the naval school (from January 1930, at the request of the management). In 1930, she became the first female member of the fr:Union des professeurs de classes préparatoires scientifiques (Accueil | prepas.org). In 1933, she taught science at the girls' high school in Toulon. Later she taught at the lycée Fénelon (1936-1942, then 1943), with an interlude at the girl's high school in Tournon, Ardèche (1939-1940), then Aix-en-Provence (1942-1943) and finally the lycée et collège Victor-Duruy (1943-1955). Her peers described her "luminous intelligence" and "exceptional mastery, without any weakness". She retired in 1955 and settled in Aix-en-Provence.

She died on January 30, 1966, aged 76. She was buried in a religious ceremony at Jouques, 25 kilometres north-east of Aix-en-Provence. Jean Rivière was buried in the same plot after his death on 16 June 1975.

== Awards ==
- 1946: Officer of Public Instruction.
- 1948: Chevalier de la legion d'honneur (Knight of the Legion of Honour).

== Published works ==
- Weston, Frank E.: Manuel pratique d'analyse organique, Paris, 1921 (as scientific editor)
- Bragg, William Henry; Bragg, William Lawrence: Rayons X et structure cristalline, Paris, Gauthier-Villars, 1921 (as translator)
- Lyman, Theodore: L'ultra-violet, Paris, F. Alcan, 1924 (as translator)
