= Gras conjecture =

Result on the p-parts of the Galois eigenspaces of an ideal class group

In algebraic number theory, the Gras conjecture (Gras 1977) relates the p-parts of the Galois eigenspaces of an ideal class group to the group of global units modulo cyclotomic units. It was proved by Mazur & Wiles (1984) as a corollary of their work on the main conjecture of Iwasawa theory. Kolyvagin (1990) later gave a simpler proof using Euler systems. A version of the Gras conjecture applying to ray class groups was later proven by Timothy All.
