= Jean Bousquet =

20th-century French Hellenist

Jean Bousquet (9 May 1912, Bordeaux – 1 April 1996, aged 83) was a 20th-century French Hellenist.

== Biography ==
In 1931, Jean Bousquet was received "cacique" (first) at the admission competition of the École normale supérieure, in the same class than his future friend Georges Pompidou. Also received in first position at the agrégation in humanities, Jean Bousquet was admitted in 1936 to the French School at Athens. First a professor in a Bordeaux high school in 1942, he then served from 1946 at the Chair of ancient Greek in the University of Rennes.

An archaeologist and epigrapher, Jean Bousquet was one of the leading specialists of the Hellenic sanctuary of Delphi where he led several excavation missions, and of the site on the island of Delos. In this capacity, he undertook the publication of accounts of the Delphic Amphictyonic League, a set of papers which allowed to assess the balance of power in the classical Greek world.

In 1971, he was appointed Director of the École Normale Supérieure by Georges Pompidou in replacement of another Greek scholar, Robert Flacelière. His discretion and efficacity served him in coping with student unrest following May '68 and a distressing incident involving the murder in 1980 of sociologist Hélène Rytmann by her husband and ENS professor, Louis Althusser.

Jean Bousquet was a regular member of the congregation at the Ecole Normale's parish church, Saint Etienne du Mont.

Jean Bousquet was renowned for his witty puns (canulars) regularly posted on his official noticeboard.

In 1981, at the end of his term in office, he returned to teaching and was elected a Greek language and civilization professor at the Paris-Sorbonne University, a position he held until his retirement.

== Works ==
- 1946: Le sanctuaire de Delphes et les fouilles françaises
- 1952: Fouilles de Delphes : le trésor de Cyrène à Delphes
- 1972: L'Art grec (with Kostas Papaïoannou), series. "L'art et les grandes civilisations"
- 1977: Armée romaine et provinces
- 1988: Études sur les comptes de Delphes
- 1988: La stèle des Kyténiens à Xanthos de Lycie. In: Revue des Études Grecques, tome 101, fascicule 480-481, Janvier-juin 1988. pp. 12-53
- 1989: Corpus des inscriptions de Delphes. Volume II, Les comptes du quatrième et du troisième siècle.

== See also ==
- École Normale Supérieure

== Sources ==
- Nicolas Weill, Jean Bousquet, helléniste et ancien directeur de la Rue-d'Ulm, Le Monde, 5 April 1996
