= Christopher Skinner =

American mathematician (born 1972)

- Born: 4 June 1972 (age 54); Little Rock, Arkansas
- Education: University of Michigan, Princeton University
- Known for: Main conjecture of Iwasawa theory for modular curves
- Scientific career
- Fields: Mathematics
- Workplaces: Princeton University
- Thesis: Deformations of Galois Representations (1997)
- Doctoral advisor: Andrew Wiles
- Doctoral students: Ellen Eischen

Christopher McLean Skinner (born 4 June 1972) is an American mathematician and professor at Princeton University. He works in algebraic number theory and arithmetic aspects of the Langlands program.

== Early life and education ==
Skinner was born on 4 June 1972, in Little Rock, Arkansas. Skinner graduated with a B.A. from the University of Michigan in 1993. He received a Ph.D. from Princeton University in 1997 under the supervision of Andrew Wiles.

== Career ==
Skinner was a member of the Institute for Advanced Study from 1997 to 2000. He was then an associate professor of mathematics at the University of Michigan from 2000 to 2004, and then a full professor from 2004 to 2006. He became a professor of mathematics at Princeton University in 2006.

== Research ==
Skinner and Wiles proved modularity results for residually reducible Galois representations in joint work.

Skinner and Eric Urban proved many cases of Iwasawa–Greenberg main conjectures for a large class of modular forms. As a consequence, for a modular elliptic curve over the rational numbers, they prove that the vanishing of the Hasse–Weil L-function L(E, s) of E at s = 1 implies that the p-adic Selmer group of E is infinite. Combined with theorems of Gross–Zagier and Kolyvagin, this gave a conditional proof (on the Tate–Shafarevich conjecture) of the conjecture that E has infinitely many rational points if and only if L(E, 1) = 0, a (weak) form of the Birch–Swinnerton-Dyer conjecture. These results were used by Manjul Bhargava, Skinner, and Wei Zhang to prove that a positive proportion of elliptic curves satisfy the Birch–Swinnerton-Dyer conjecture.

== Awards and honors ==
Skinner won first prize and $20,000 in the Westinghouse Science Competition in 1989 for solving a math problem related to Diophantine equations. Skinner was a Packard Foundation Fellow from 2001 to 2006 and a Sloan Research Fellow from 2001 to 2002. He was named an inaugural Fellow of the American Mathematical Society in 2013. In 2015, he was named a Simons Investigator in Mathematics.

He was an invited speaker at the International Congress of Mathematicians in Madrid in 2006.
