= Eric Urban =

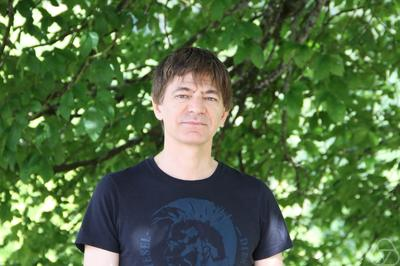
- Urban at the Mathematical Research Institute of Oberwolfach in 2018
- Education: Paris-Sud University
- Awards: Guggenheim Fellowship (2007)
- Scientific career
- Fields: Mathematics
- Workplaces: Columbia University
- Thesis: Arithmétique des formes automorphes pour GL(2) sur un corps imaginaire quadratique (1994)
- Doctoral advisor: Jacques Tilouine

Eric Jean-Paul Urban is a professor of mathematics at Columbia University working in number theory and automorphic forms, particularly Iwasawa theory.

== Career ==
Urban received his PhD in mathematics from Paris-Sud University in 1994 under the supervision of Jacques Tilouine. He is a professor of mathematics at Columbia University.

== Research ==
Together with Christopher Skinner, Urban proved many cases of Iwasawa–Greenberg main conjectures for a large class of modular forms. As a consequence, for a modular elliptic curve over the rational numbers, they prove that the vanishing of the Hasse–Weil L-function L(E, s) of E at s = 1 implies that the p-adic Selmer group of E is infinite. Combined with theorems of Gross-Zagier and Kolyvagin, this gave a conditional proof (on the Tate–Shafarevich conjecture) of the conjecture that E has infinitely many rational points if and only if L(E, 1) = 0, a (weak) form of the Birch–Swinnerton-Dyer conjecture. These results were used (in joint work with Manjul Bhargava and Wei Zhang) to prove that a positive proportion of elliptic curves satisfy the Birch–Swinnerton-Dyer conjecture.

== Awards ==
Urban was awarded a Guggenheim Fellowship in 2007.

== Selected publications ==
- Urban, Eric (2011). "Eigenvarieties for reductive groups". Annals of Mathematics. Second Series. 174 (3): 1685–1784. doi:10.4007/annals.2011.174.3.7. ISSN 0003-486X.
- Skinner, Christopher; Urban, Eric (2014). "The Iwasawa Main Conjectures for GL2". Inventiones Mathematicae. 195 (1): 1–277. Bibcode:2014InMat.195....1S. doi:10.1007/s00222-013-0448-1. ISSN 0020-9910. S2CID 120848645.
