= Robert Flacelière =

French scholar of Classical Greek

- Born: May 29, 1904; Paris, France
- Died: 23 March 1982 (aged 77); Montpellier
- Education: Collège Sainte-Barbe, Lycée Henri IV, École Normale Supérieure
- Occupation: Director of the École Normale Supérieure

Robert Flacelière (French: [flasljɛʁ]; 29 May 1904, Paris – 23 May 1982, Montpellier) was a scholar of Classical Greek. He was educated at the Collège Sainte-Barbe, the Lycée Henri IV and the École Normale Supérieure. From 1925 to 1930, he was a member of the French School in Athens and from 1932-1948 a Professor of the Faculty of Letters at University of Lyon. He was then appointed to the Chair of Greek Language and Literature at the University of Paris, a post he held until 1963 when he was appointed Director of the École Normale Supérieure.

== Biography ==
After brilliant studies at the Lycée Henri-IV, he entered the École normale supérieure (Paris) in 1922, and passed the agrégation in grammar in 1925. That same year, he joined the French School at Athens, where his main interest was Epigraphy. His Doctorate thesis, defended in 1935 and published in 1937, was entitled Les Aitoliens à Delphes: contributions à l'histoire de la Grèce centrale au IIIe siècle av.J.-C. (The Aitolians at Delphi: contributions to the history of central Greece in the 3rd century BC). He taught Greek language and literature at the Faculté des Lettres in Lyon (from 1932 to 1948), then at the Faculté des Lettres in Paris. In 1967, he was elected member of the Académie des Inscriptions et Belles-Lettres.

During the student revolt of May 1968, Flacelière organized a petition of faculty members against the rebelling students and found himself at the center of a heated controversy.

He headed the École normale supérieure from 1963 to 1971. President Georges Pompidou, himself an alumnus of the school, put an end to his duties after Maoist groups occupied the school during the "Night of the Paris Commune". He then became director of the Fondation Thiers, from 1975 to 1980.

In February 1978, he was one of the founding members of the Comité des intellectuels pour l'Europe des libertés.

On his return from a Mediterranean cruise, he died on May 23, 1982.

== Bibliography ==
- Gaston Colin; André Plassart; Marie-José Chavane; Robert Flacelière; Thérèse Oziol; Jean Pouilloux (1922). Inscriptions de la terrasse du temple et de la région nord du sanctuaire: Nos. 87-275 (in French). Boccard.
- Robert Flacelière (1937). Les Aitoliens à Delphes (in French). de Boccard.
- Robert Flacelière (1938). Etudes d'archéologie grecque... (in French). Gand.
- Robert Flacelière; Plutarchus (1941). Plutarque: sur l'E de Delphes (in French). Les Belles Lettres.
- Robert Flacelière (1942). Le Gymnase athénien... (in French). impr. générale.
- Robert Flacelière (1945). Renaissance liturgique et vie paroissiale (in French). Seuil.
- Robert Flacelière (1947). Amour humain et parole divine: recueil de textes de la Bible et des Pères choisis et présentés par Robert Flacelière (in French). Éditions du Seuil. ISBN 9782020029803.
- Plutarch; Robert Flacelière (1947). Sur la disparation des oracles: texte et traduction (in French). Les Belles Lettres.
- Robert Flacelière (1952). Dialogue Sur L'amour-Eroticos. Texte Et Traduction Avec Une Introduction Et Des Notes Par Robert Flacelière (in French).
- M. G. Colin; Robert Flacelière; École française d'Athènes (1954). Les inscriptions de la terrasse du temple et de la région nord du sanctuaire: Planches (in French). Boccard.
- Robert Flacelière (1959). La vie quotidienne en Grèce au siècle de Périclès (in French). Hachette.

with Jean Daniélou Jean Chrysostome, Homélies sur l'incompréhensible, Sources Chrétiennes 28

=== English translations (selected) ===
- Robert Flacelière (1962). Love in Ancient Greece. Crown Publishers.
- Robert Flacelière (1964). A Literary History of Greece. Chicago: Aldine Publishing Company.
- Robert Flaceliere (1965). Daily Life in Greece at the Time of Pericles. Weidenfeld and Nicolson. ISBN 9781842125076.
- Robert Flacelière (1965). Greek oracles. Elek Books. ISBN 9780236311453.
