= Jean-Claude Sikorav =

French mathematician

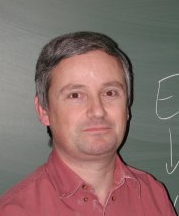
Jean-Claude Sikorav

Jean-Claude Sikorav (born 21 June 1957) is a French mathematician. He is professor at the École normale supérieure de Lyon. He is specialized in symplectic geometry.

== Main contributions ==
Sikorav is known for his proof, joint with François Laudenbach, of the Arnold conjecture for Lagrangian intersections in cotangent bundles, as well as for introducing generating families in symplectic topology.

== Selected publications ==
Sikorav is one of fifteen members of a group of mathematicians who published the book Uniformisation des surfaces de Riemann under the pseudonym of Henri Paul de Saint-Gervais.

He has written the survey

- Sikorav, Jean-Claude (1994), "Some properties of holomorphic curves in almost complex manifolds", Holomorphic curves in symplectic geometry, Progress in Mathematics, vol. 117, Basel: Birkhäuser, pp. 165–189, MR 1274929.

and research papers

- Hofer, Helmut; Lizan, Véronique; Sikorav, Jean-Claude (1997), "On genericity for holomorphic curves in four-dimensional almost-complex manifolds", Journal of Geometric Analysis, 7 (1): 149–159, doi:10.1007/BF02921708, MR 1630789, S2CID 119936346.
- Laudenbach, François; Sikorav, Jean-Claude (1985), "Persistance d'intersection avec la section nulle au cours d'une isotopie hamiltonienne dans un fibré cotangent", Inventiones Mathematicae, 82 (2): 349–357, Bibcode:1985InMat..82..349L, doi:10.1007/BF01388807, MR 0809719, S2CID 122242002.

== Honors ==
Sikorav is a Knight of the Ordre des Palmes Académiques.
