= Liouba Bortniker =

Russian-French mathematician

Liouba Bortniker (1 June 1860 – after 1903) was a Ukrainian-French mathematician who was the first woman to earn an agrégation in mathematics, the inaugural winner of the Peccot–Vimont prize of the Collège de France, and the first woman to publish in the Comptes rendus de l'Académie des Sciences. She was known for her work on cyclides.

== Early life, education, and agrégation ==
Bortniker was born into a Jewish family on 20 May 1860 (according to the Julian calendar; 1 June in the Gregorian calendar) in Alexandrovka, a town that was at the time part of the Russian Empire and later became part of modern Ukraine. She left her family to move to Paris in 1879, earned a baccalauréat in 1880, and earned a licenciate in mathematical sciences 1881 through the Paris faculty of sciences; her jury consisted of mathematicians Jean Claude Bouquet and Jules Tannery, and astronomer Félix Tisserand. She became an assistant teacher in Sèvres, and was granted residency in France in December 1881.

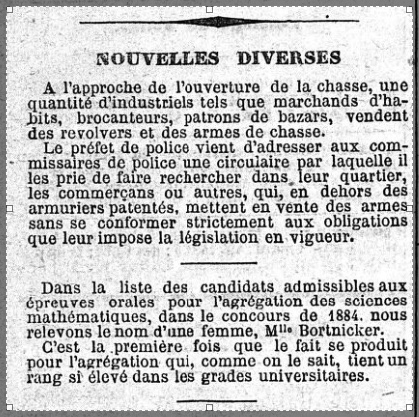
"C'est le premier fois que ce fait se produit" (transl. It's the first time that this fact happened). Journal des débats of 20 August 1884.

She took a leave from this position in 1883 to continue her studies, under a scholarship, and in 1884 was deemed eligible to attempt the agrégation, the first time this was ever allowed for a woman. However, because of poor performance on the oral component of the examination, she did not pass. In June 1885 she became a French citizen and in July and August 1885 she attempted the agrégation again, this time passing as the second out of twelve passing scores from over 100 registrants. After Bortniker in 1885, it was not until 1920 that Madeleine Chaumont and Georgette Parize became the next women to receive the masculine agrégation, although by then an easier agrégation for women, aimed at teachers, had been introduced.

== Teaching career, research, and Peccot prize ==
Bortniker became a science teacher at the lycée de jeunes filles in Montpellier. In 1886 Bortniker was named the inaugural winner of the Peccot–Vimont prize, which would later develop into the Peccot Lectures. The next two winners of the prize, Jacques Hadamard and Élie Cartan, became famous research mathematicians, as did many later recipients. Bortniker continued to publish sporadically over the next few years, including work on cyclides (shapes generalizing the torus), with an 1887 publication in the Comptes rendus de l'Académie des Sciences noted as being the first publication in that journal by a woman.

She began working towards a doctoral thesis with Jean Gaston Darboux, but never completed it. In 1888 a group of mathematicians wrote a letter to the French government encouraging them to provide a maître de conférences position to Bortniker, comparing her favorably to Sofya Kovalevskaya but writing that Bortniker's modesty prevented her from advancing her own interests; Darboux wrote a second letter of support. With this support, she became the head of science at the Lycée Molière (Paris).

== Illness and later life ==
From 1890 onward, Bortniker's health deteriorated, and she had to take many leaves from the school. She visited to her family in Odessa for treatment in 1892 and by 1893 was writing long letters to the French government, asking for longer leaves and revealing in her writing the delirious state her mind had been brought to. She was granted annual leaves from her teaching position from 1893 to 1897, despite her request to return to teaching in 1896. She was admitted to a mental clinic in 1899, transferred to another in 1902, and transferred again in 1903 to a facility in Picauville. The records from this facility were destroyed in World War II, leaving her fate after that point unknown.
