= Nicola Pinna =

- Born: 14 November 1974 (age 51); Milan, Italy
- Scientific career
- Fields: Inorganic chemistry
- Institutions: Humboldt University, Berlin

Nicola Pinna (born 14 November 1974 in Milan, Italy) is a chemist and professor at the Humboldt University of Berlin.

== Scientific career ==
Pinna's doctoral studies were undertaken at Pierre and Marie Curie University (Paris) with a focus on physical chemistry. His postdoctoral work at Fritz Haber Institute of the MPG (Berlin) saw him researching the catalytic properties of vanadium oxide nanoparticles. He has since worked at the Max Planck Institute of Colloids and Interfaces (Potsdam), Martin Luther University of Halle-Wittenberg, the University of Aveiro (Portugal), and Seoul National University (Korea). He has been a professor of inorganic chemistry at the Humboldt University of Berlin since July 2012. From July 2016 to April 2021 he was also head of the Department of Chemistry.

His research focuses on nanostructured materials, mainly dealing with the synthesis of nanomaterials by solution and gas phase routes, their characterization and the study of their physical properties. In particular, his research interests include the synthesis of crystalline metal oxide nanoparticles, heterostructures, hybrid materials and thin films by novel nonaqueous sol-gel routes, their assembly, and the study of their physical properties such as optical, electrical, electrochemical, magnetic, catalytic, and gas sensing.

In 2011, he was ranked among the top 100 materials scientists of the past decade by impact.

He is executive editor of the Journal of Nanoparticle Research, associate editor of Carbon Energy, EcoEnergy and was member of the editorial board of the Journal CrystEngComm from 2011 to 2015. Additionally he published books on Atomic Layer Deposition and the synthesis of nanoparticles.
