= Main conjecture of Iwasawa theory =

Theorem in algebraic number theory relating p-adic L-functions and ideal class groups

- Field: Algebraic number theory Iwasawa theory
- Conjectured by: Kenkichi Iwasawa
- Conjectured in: 1969
- First proof by: Barry Mazur; Andrew Wiles
- First proof in: 1984

In mathematics, the main conjecture of Iwasawa theory is a deep relationship between p-adic L-functions and ideal class groups of cyclotomic fields, proved by Kenkichi Iwasawa for primes satisfying the Kummer–Vandiver conjecture and proved for all primes by Barry Mazur and Andrew Wiles. The Herbrand–Ribet theorem and the Gras conjecture are both easy consequences of the main conjecture.

There are several generalizations of the main conjecture, to totally real fields, CM fields, elliptic curves, and so on.

== Motivation ==
Iwasawa was partly motivated by an analogy with Weil's description of the zeta function of an algebraic curve over a finite field in terms of eigenvalues of the Frobenius endomorphism on its Jacobian variety. In this analogy,

- The action of the Frobenius corresponds to the action of the group Γ.
- The Jacobian of a curve corresponds to a module X over Γ defined in terms of ideal class groups.
- The zeta function of a curve over a finite field corresponds to a p-adic L-function.
- Weil's theorem relating the eigenvalues of Frobenius to the zeros of the zeta function of the curve corresponds to Iwasawa's main conjecture relating the action of the Iwasawa algebra on X to zeros of the p-adic zeta function.

== History ==
The main conjecture of Iwasawa theory was formulated as an assertion that the two methods of defining p-adic L-functions (by Galois modules or by interpolation of special values of L-functions) should coincide, as far as that was well-defined. This was proved by Mazur and Wiles for Q. Wiles later proved it for all totally real number fields. These proofs were modeled upon Ken Ribet's proof of the converse to Herbrand's theorem (the Herbrand–Ribet theorem).

Karl Rubin found a more elementary proof of the Mazur–Wiles theorem by using Thaine's method and Kolyvagin's Euler systems, and later proved other generalizations of the main conjecture for imaginary quadratic fields.

In 2014, Christopher Skinner and Eric Urban proved several cases of the main conjectures for a large class of modular forms. As a consequence, for a modular elliptic curve over the rational numbers, they prove that the vanishing of the Hasse–Weil L-function L(E, s) of E at s = 1 implies that the p-adic Selmer group of E is infinite. Combined with theorems of Gross-Zagier and Kolyvagin, this gave a conditional proof (on the Tate–Shafarevich conjecture) of the conjecture that E has infinitely many rational points if and only if L(E, 1) = 0, a (weak) form of the Birch–Swinnerton-Dyer conjecture. These results were used by Manjul Bhargava, Skinner, and Wei Zhang to prove that a positive proportion of elliptic curves satisfy the Birch–Swinnerton-Dyer conjecture.

== Statement ==
- p is a prime number.
- F_{n} is the field Q(ζ) where ζ is a root of unity of order p^{n+1}.
- Γ is the largest subgroup of the absolute Galois group of F_{∞} isomorphic to the p-adic integers.
- γ is a topological generator of Γ.
- L_{n} is the p-Hilbert class field of F_{n}.
- H_{n} is the Galois group Gal(L_{n}/F_{n}), isomorphic to the subgroup of elements of the ideal class group of F_{n} whose order is a power of p.
- H_{∞} is the inverse limit of the Galois groups H_{n}.
- V is the vector space H_{∞}⊗_{Z_{p}}Q_{p}.
- ω is the Teichmüller character.
- V^{i} is the ω^{i} eigenspace of V.
- h_{p}(ω^{i},T) is the characteristic polynomial of γ acting on the vector space V^{i}.
- L_{p} is the p-adic L function with L_{p}(ω^{i},1–k) = –B_{k}(ω^{i–k})/k, where B is a generalized Bernoulli number.
- u is the unique p-adic number satisfying γ(ζ) = ζ^{u} for all p-power roots of unity ζ.
- G_{p} is the power series with G_{p}(ω^{i},u^{s}–1) = L_{p}(ω^{i},s).

The main conjecture of Iwasawa theory proved by Mazur and Wiles states that if i is an odd integer not congruent to 1 mod p–1 then the ideals of $\mathbf Z_p[[T]]$ generated by h_{p}(ω^{i},T) and G_{p}(ω^{1–i},T) are equal.

== Sources ==
- Baker, Matt (2014-03-10). "The BSD conjecture is true for most elliptic curves". Matt Baker's Math Blog.
- Bhargava, Manjul; Skinner, Christopher; Zhang, Wei (2014), "A majority of elliptic curves over Q satisfy the Birch and Swinnerton-Dyer conjecture", arXiv:1407.1826 [math.NT]
- Coates, J.; Sujatha, R. (2006). Cyclotomic Fields and Zeta Values. Springer Monographs in Mathematics. Berlin, Heidelberg: Springer. ISBN 978-3-540-33068-4. Zbl 1100.11002.
- Iwasawa, Kenkichi (1964). "On some modules in the theory of cyclotomic fields". Journal of the Mathematical Society of Japan. 16 (1): 42–82. doi:10.2969/jmsj/01610042. MR 0215811.
- Iwasawa, Kenkichi (1969a). "Analogies between number fields and function fields". Some Recent Advances in the Basic Sciences, Vol. 2. New York: Yeshiva University. pp. 203–208. MR 0255510.
- Iwasawa, Kenkichi (1969b). "On p-adic L-functions". Annals of Mathematics. 89 (1): 198–205. doi:10.2307/1970817. MR 0269627.
- Kakde, Mahesh (2013). "The main conjecture of Iwasawa theory for totally real fields". Inventiones Mathematicae. 193 (3): 539–626. doi:10.1007/s00222-012-0436-x. MR 3091976.
- Lang, Serge (1990) [1978, 1980]. Cyclotomic Fields I and II. Graduate Texts in Mathematics. Vol. 121 (combined 2nd ed.). New York: Springer. ISBN 978-0-387-96671-7. Zbl 0704.11038.
- Manin, Yu I.; Panchishkin, A. A. (2007) [1990]. Introduction to Modern Number Theory. Encyclopaedia of Mathematical Sciences. Vol. 49 (2nd ed.). Berlin, Heidelberg: Springer. ISBN 978-3-540-20364-3. Zbl 1079.11002.
- Mazur, Barry; Wiles, Andrew (1984). "Class fields of abelian extensions of Q". Inventiones Mathematicae. 76 (2): 179–330. doi:10.1007/BF01388599. MR 0742853.
- Skinner, Christopher; Urban, Eric (2014). "The Iwasawa main conjectures for GL_{2}". Inventiones Mathematicae. 195 (1): 1–277. doi:10.1007/s00222-013-0448-1. MR 3148103.
- Washington, Lawrence C. (1997) [1982]. Introduction to Cyclotomic Fields. Graduate Texts in Mathematics. Vol. 83 (2nd ed.). New York: Springer. ISBN 978-0-387-94762-4.
- Wiles, Andrew (1990). "The Iwasawa conjecture for totally real fields". Annals of Mathematics. 131 (3): 493–540. doi:10.2307/1971468. MR 1053488.
