= École normale supérieure (Paris) =

Institution of higher learning in Paris, France

École normale supérieure - PSL
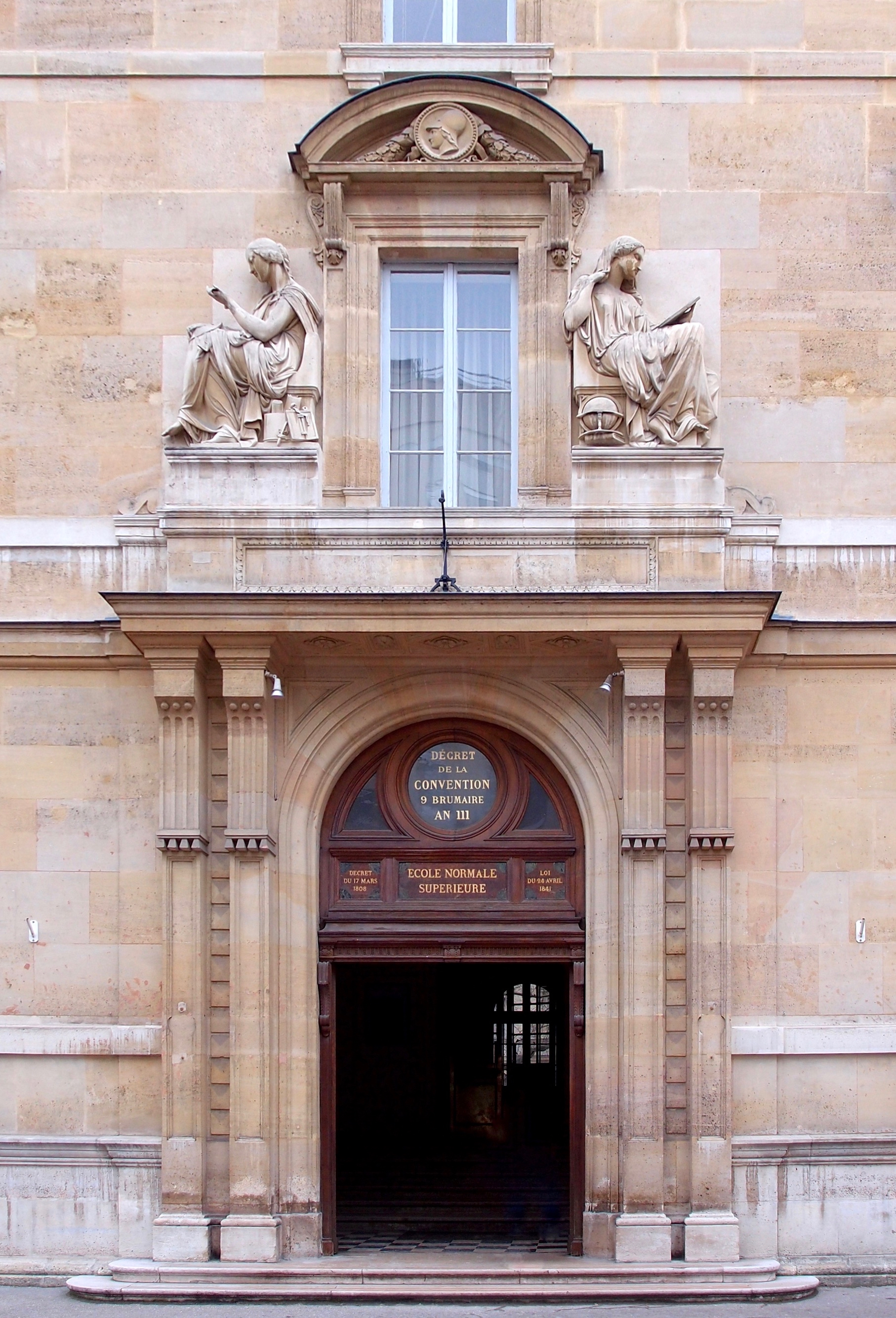
- Entrance of the historic building of the ENS, at Rue d'Ulm 45
- Other names: Normale sup', ENS, ENS Ulm, ENS-PSL, ENS Paris
- Type: École normale supérieure, grande école, EPSCP
- Established: 1794; 232 years ago
- Founder: National Convention
- Parent institution: PSL University
- Affiliations: Conférence des grandes écoles
- Budget: $130 million
- President: Pierre-Louis Lions
- Director: Frédéric Worms
- Academic staff: 1,400 (630 teaching fellows, 170 professors and 580 post-doctoral researchers)
- Students: 2,400
- Undergraduates: 300
- Postgraduates: 1,400
- Doctoral students: 700
- Location: rue d'Ulm, Paris, 75005, France
- Campus: Urban: 4 main sites in Paris and its suburbs (5th & 14th arrondissements, Montrouge)
- Colours: Purple
- Website: ens.psl.eu

The École normale supérieure - PSL (French pronunciation: [ekɔl nɔʁmal sypeʁjœʁ]; also known as ENS, Normale sup', Ulm or ENS Paris) is a grande école in Paris, France. It is one of the constituent members of Paris Sciences et Lettres University (PSL). Due to its selectivity, historical role, and influence within French society, the ENS is generally considered the most prestigious of the grandes écoles, as well as one of the most prestigious higher education institutions in France. Its pupils are generally referred to as normaliens, while its alumni are sometimes referred to as archicubes.

The school was founded in 1794 during the French Revolution, to provide homogeneous training of high-school teachers in France, but it later closed. The school was subsequently reestablished by Napoleon I as pensionnat normal from 1808 to 1822, before being recreated in 1826 and taking the name École normale in 1830. When other institutes called écoles normales were created in 1845, the word supérieure (meaning upper) was added to form the current name. In 1936, the institution started providing university-level education.

As a grande école, the vast majority of the academic staff hosted at the ENS also belong to external institutions such as one of the Parisian universities, the CNRS and the EHESS. Generalistic in its recruitment and organisation, the ENS is the only grande école in France to have departments of research in all the natural, social, and human sciences. Its alumni include 14 Nobel Prize laureates, of whom eight are in Physics, 12 Fields Medal recipients, more than half the recipients of the CNRS's Gold Medal, several hundred members of the Institut de France, as well as several French and foreign politicians and statespeople. Relative to the size of its student body, the ENS has produced a higher proportion of Nobel laureates than any other institution globally, including universities such as Harvard and Oxford.

== History ==
=== Founding ===
The current institution finds its roots in the creation of the École normale de l'an III by the post-revolutionary National Convention led by Robespierre in 1794. The school was created based on a recommendation by Joseph Lakanal and Dominique-Joseph Garat, who were part of the commission on public education. The École normale was intended as the core of a planned centralised national education system. The project was also conceived as a way to reestablish trust between the Republic and the country's elites, which had been alienated to some degree by the Reign of Terror. The decree establishing the school, issued on 30 October 1794 (9 brumaire an III), states in its first article that "There will be established in Paris an école normale (literally, a normal school), where, from all the parts of the Republic, citizens already educated in the useful sciences shall be called upon to learn, from the best professors in all the disciplines, the art of teaching."

The inaugural course was given on 20 January 1795 and the last on 19 May of the same year at the Museum of Natural History. The goal of these courses was to train a body of teachers for all the secondary schools in the country and thereby to ensure a homogenous education for all. These courses covered all the existing sciences and humanities and were given by renowned scholars, including scientists Monge, Vandermonde, Daubenton, Berthollet and philosophers Bernardin de Saint-Pierre and Volney. The school was closed as a result of the arrival of the French Directory but this école normale was to serve as a basis when the school was founded for the second time by Napoleon I in 1808.

On 17 March 1808, Napoleon created by decree a pensionnat normal within the imperial University of France charged with "training in the art of teaching the sciences and the humanities". The establishment was opened in 1810, its strict code including a mandatory uniform. By then a sister establishment had been created by Napoleon in Pisa under the name of Scuola Normale Superiore (SNS), which continues to exist today and still has close ties to the Paris school. Up to 1818, the students were handpicked by the academy inspectors based on their results in the secondary school. However, the "pensionnat" created by Napoleon came to be perceived under the Restoration as a nexus of liberal thought and was suppressed by then-minister of public instruction Denis-Luc Frayssinous in 1824.

=== Second founding ===
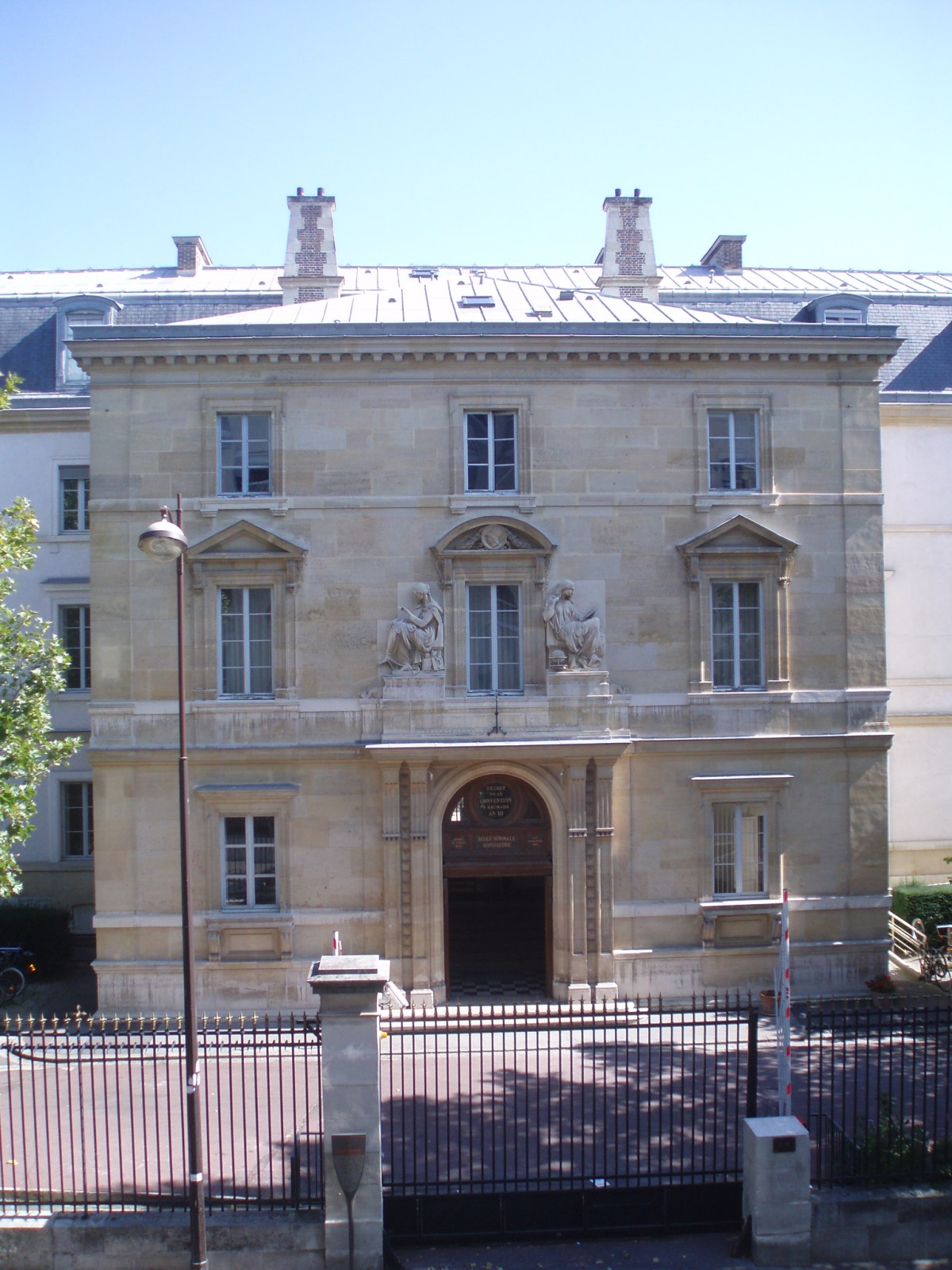
The main entrance to the ENS on Rue d'Ulm. The school moved into its current premises in 1847.

An école préparatoire was created on 9 March 1826 at the site of Collège Louis-le-Grand. This date can be taken as the definitive date of creation of the current school. After the July Revolution, the school regained its original name of École normale and in 1845 was renamed École normale supérieure. During the 1830s, under the direction of philosopher Victor Cousin, the school enhanced its status as an institution to prepare the agrégation by expanding the duration of study to three years, and was divided into its present-day Sciences and Letters divisions. In 1847 the school moved into its current quarters at the rue d'Ulm, next to the Panthéon in the 5th arrondissement of Paris. This helped it gain some stability, which was further established under the direction of Louis Pasteur.

Having been recognised as a success, a second school was created on its model at Sèvres for girls in 1881, followed by other schools at Fontenay, Saint-Cloud (both of which later moved to Lyon, and Cachan). The school's status evolved further at the beginning of the twentieth century.

In 1903 it was integrated into the University of Paris as a separate college, perhaps as a result of its exposure to national attention during the Dreyfus Affair, in which its librarian Lucien Herr and his disciples, who included the socialist politician Jean Jaurès and the writers Charles Péguy and Romain Rolland spearheaded the campaign to overturn the wrongful conviction pronounced against Captain Alfred Dreyfus. The first female student – Marguerite Rouvière – was accepted in 1910, which made headline news in France and polarised opinion. The ranks of the school were significantly reduced during the First World War, but the 1920s marked a degree of expansion of the school, which had among its students at this time such figures as Raymond Aron, Jean-Paul Sartre, Vladimir Jankélévitch and Maurice Merleau-Ponty. The high sacrifice paid by normaliens in the First World War was recognized by the award of the croix de guerre avec citation à l'ordre de l'armée in 1925.

=== Twentieth century ===
After the Second World War, in which some of its students were players in the Resistance, the school became more visible and increasingly perceived as a bastion of the communist left. Many of its students belonged to the French Communist Party. This leftist tradition continued into the 1960s and 1970s, during which an important fraction of French Maoists came from ENS. In 1953 it was made autonomous from the University of Paris, but it was perceived ambivalently by the authorities as a nexus of protest, particularly due to the teachings delivered there by such controversial figures as political philosopher Louis Althusser. As of now, by law, ENS comes under the direct authority of the Minister for Higher Education and Research.

The fallout from the May 1968 protests caused the President of the Republic, Georges Pompidou, himself a former student at the school, to force the resignation of its director, Robert Flacelière and to appoint his contemporary Jean Bousquet as his successor. Both Flacelière and Bousquet were distinguished classicists.

The school continued to expand and include new subjects, seeking to cover all the disciplines of natural and social sciences and in line with this policy a new concours was opened in 1982, to reinforce the teaching of social sciences at the school. The concours, called B/L (the A/L concours standing for the traditional letters and human sciences), emphasises proficiency in mathematics and economics alongside training in philosophy and literature.

For a long time, most women were taught at a separate ENS, the École normale supérieure de jeunes filles at Sèvres. However, women were not explicitly barred entry until a law of 1940, and some women were students at Ulm before this date, such as the philosopher Simone Weil and the classicist Jacqueline de Romilly. In 1985, after heated debates, the two institutions were merged into a single entity, with its main campus at the historic site at the rue d'Ulm in Paris.

== Organisation ==
École normale supérieure is a grande école, a French institution of higher education that is separate from, but parallel and connected to, the main framework of the French public university system. Similar to the Ivy League in the United States, Russel Group in the UK, and C9 League in China, grandes écoles are elite academic institutions that admit students through an extremely competitive process. Grandes écoles typically have much smaller class sizes and student bodies than public universities in France, and many of their programs are taught in English, and while most are more expensive than French universities, École normale supérieure charges the same tuition fees: for 2021/2022, they were €243 to register for the master's degree. International internships, study abroad opportunities, and close ties with government and the corporate world are a hallmark of the grandes écoles. Degrees from École normale supérieure are accredited by the Conférence des Grandes Écoles and awarded by the Ministry of National Education (France) (French: Ministère de l'Éducation nationale). Alumni go on to occupy elite positions in government, the administration, and corporate firms in France.

=== Sites ===
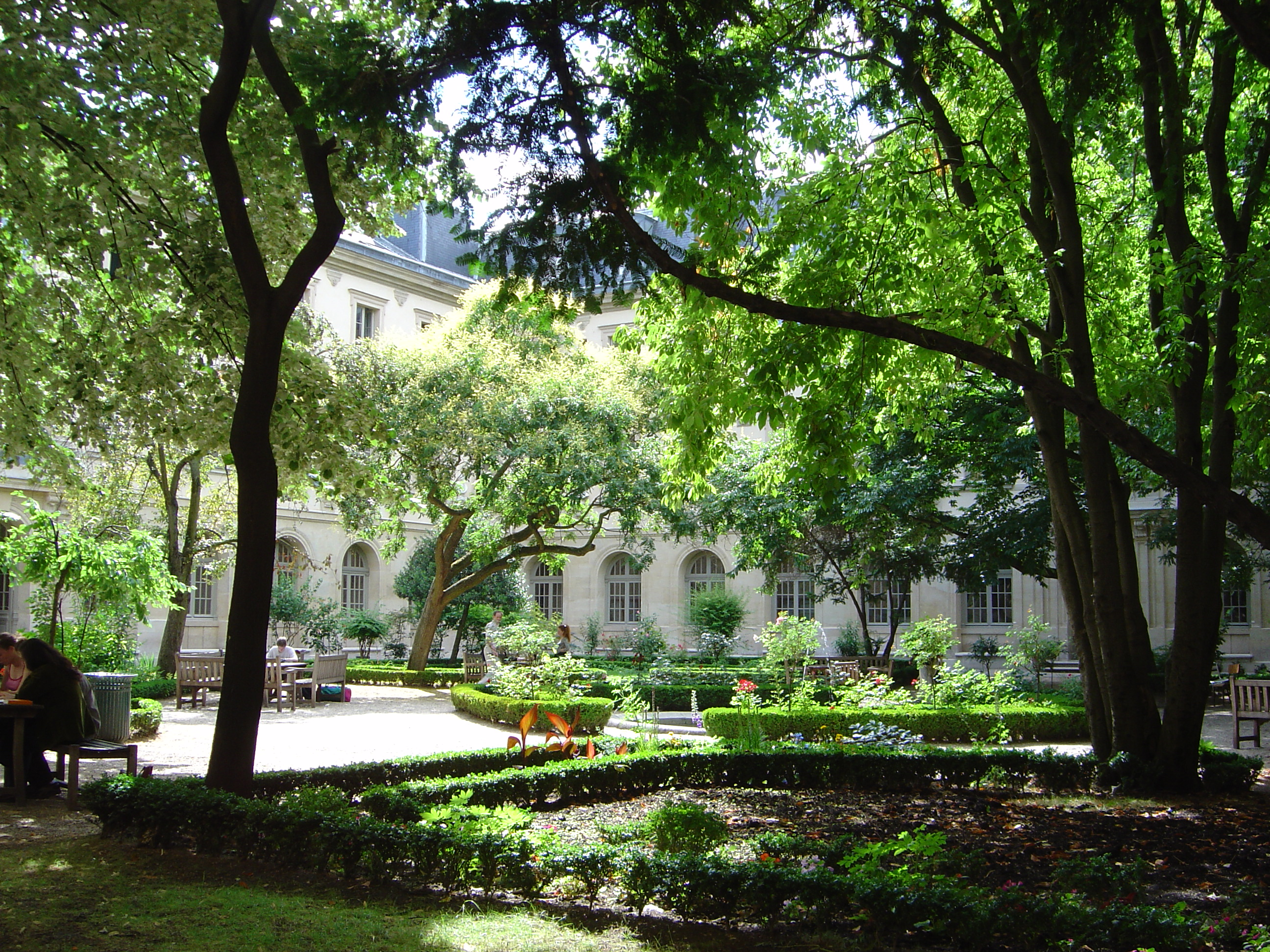
The quadrangle at the main ENS building on rue d'Ulm is known as the Cour aux Ernests – the Ernests being the goldfish in the pond.

The École normale supérieure is one of a few schools that still occupy a campus in the heart of Paris. The historic Paris ENS campus is located around the rue d'Ulm, the main building being at 45 rue d'Ulm in the 5th arrondissement of Paris, which was built by architect Alphonse de Gisors and given to ENS by law in 1841. Above the entrance door are sculptures of two female figures who respectively represent letters and sciences. They are portrayed sitting on either side of a medallion of Minerva, who represents wisdom. A formalised version of this frontal piece is used as the school's emblem.

The main site at 45 rue d'Ulm is organized around a central courtyard, the Cour aux Ernests. Another courtyard south of this one, the Cour Pasteur, separates the school from the apartment buildings of the rue Claude-Bernard. These buildings house the administrative functions of the school, and some of its literary departments (philosophy, literature, classics and archeology), its mathematics and computer science departments, as well as its main human sciences library. The site's monument aux morts, which was inaugurated in 1923 and stands as a reminder of the normaliens who died in the First World War, is a work by Paul Landowski.

Several auxiliary buildings surround this main campus in adjacent streets. The closest one, opposite the main entrance, at 46 rue d'Ulm, houses the school's biology department and laboratories as well as a part of its student residences. The seat of the school's physics and chemistry departments, inaugurated in 1936 by Léon Blum and Albert Lebrun, lies north of the school on rue Lhomond, while further up the rue d'Ulm its number 29 houses secondary libraries and the school's department of cognitive sciences.

ENS has a second campus on Boulevard Jourdan (previously the women's college), in the 14th arrondissement of Paris, which is home to the school's research department of social sciences, law, economics and geography, as well as further student residences. The site has been undergoing major reconstruction since 2015. In 2017, President Francois Hollande inaugurated a new building on site, which is home to the ENS economics department, the school's social science library, and the Paris School of Economics, an ENS project.

The school has a secondary site in the suburb of Montrouge, which houses some of its laboratories alongside those of Paris Descartes University. It features green areas and sporting facilities as well as some 200 student rooms. A fourth site in the town of Villejuif, south of Paris, hosts some of the school's biology laboratories.

=== Recruitment ===
The school is very small in student numbers. Its core of students, who are called normaliens, are selected via a competitive exam called a concours (baccalaureate + 2 years). Preparation for the concours takes place in preparatory classes which last two years (see grandes écoles). Two hundred normaliens are thus recruited every year, half of them in the sciences and the same number in the humanities, and receive a monthly salary (around €1,350/month in 2018), and in exchange they sign a ten-year contract to work for the state. Although it is seldom applied in practice, this exclusivity clause is redeemable (often by the hiring firm).

Other students called "normaliens étudiants" can be selected but they do not have their study paid. They are selected with the preparation of a research project (baccalaureate + 2–4 years). PhD students at ENS are either graduate students from the ENS doctoral school or from another doctoral school co-accredited by ENS. Since 2016 PhD students preparing their doctoral research at ENS are awarded a PhD from PSL University. ENS also welcomes selected foreign students (the "international selection"), participates in various graduate programs, and has extensive research laboratories. The foreign students selected often receive a scholarship which covers their expenses.

The students selected via the concours remain at the school for a length of time ranging from four to six years. Normaliens from France and other European Union countries are considered civil servants in training. Many students devote at least one of those years to the agrégation, which allows them to teach in high schools or universities. Faculty recruitment is selective, with between zero and one ENS professorship open per year. Faculty recruitments usually happen upon previous incumbent retirements. In informal ENS jargon, ENS full professors are popularly called PdPs ("professeurs des professeurs)" because traditionally ENS was created to educate future professors.

=== Divisions ===
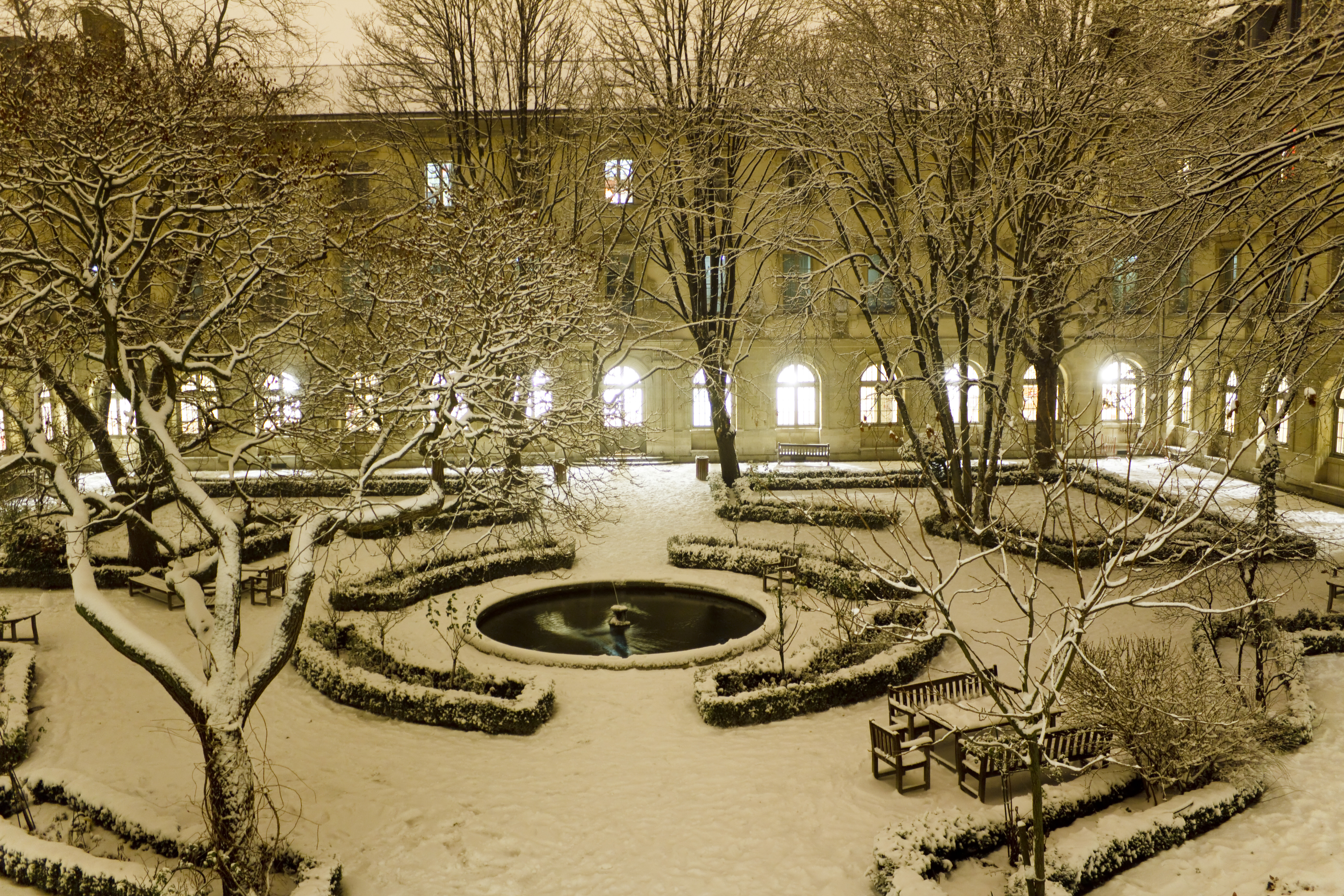
The school's Cour aux Ernests under a coat of snow (2013)

Founded to train high school teachers through the agrégation, ENS is now an institution training researchers, professors, high-level civil servants, and business and political leaders. It focuses on the association of training and research, with an emphasis on freedom of curriculum. The school's resources are equally divided between its "Letters" (social and human sciences and literature) and its "Sciences" (natural sciences and mathematics) sections. The school's fifteen departments and its thirty-five units of research (unités mixtes de recherches or UMR in French) work in close coordination with other public French research institutions such as the CNRS.

The school has seven departments in its "Sciences" section: mathematics; physics; computer science; chemistry; biology; geoscience; and cognitive science. It also has eight departments in its "Letters" section: philosophy; literature; history; classics; social science; economics (this section is the base of Paris School of Economics); geography; and art history and theory. In addition to these fifteen departments, a language laboratory for non-specialists offers courses in most major world languages to all the students. Additional centres of research and laboratories gravitate around the departments, which function as nodes of research.

The emphasis is placed squarely on interdisciplinarity. Students who entered from a scientific concours (thus having mainly studied in their preparatory school maths, physics, and chemistry or biology) are encouraged to attend courses in the literary departments. Conversely, maths and physics introductory courses are on offer for the students from the "literary" departments. The ENS graduate degree, instituted in 2006, requires students to attend a certain number of courses not related to their major.

=== Libraries ===
The École normale supérieure has a network, known as Rubens, of ten libraries shared over its sites, which taken together make up the third largest library in France. The catalogue is available for consultation online. Entrance to the libraries is reserved for domestic and international researchers of doctoral level, as well as to the teachers at the school, normaliens, other ENS students, and PSL Research University students. The main library, devoted to literature, classics, and human sciences, dates back to the nineteenth century when it was greatly expanded by its director, the famous dreyfusard Lucien Herr. Its main reading room is protected as a monument historique. This main library, which covers several thousand square metres, is one of the largest free access funds of books in France, with upwards of 800,000 books readily available and more than 1,600 periodicals. Its classics section is part of the national network of specialised libraries (Cadist).

A secondary library concerned with social science, economics, and law is located at the Jourdan campus for social science. This library has more than 150,000 books in the subjects it covers. The school also has specialised libraries in archeology, cognitive sciences, mathematics and computer science, theoretical physics. A recently unified natural sciences library was opened in 2013, aiming to bring together in a central place on rue d'Ulm the libraries of physics, chemistry, biology and geoscience. The school also features two specialised centres for documentation, the Bibliothèque des Archives Husserl, and the Centre d'Archives de Philosophie, d'Histoire et d'Edition des Sciences.

=== Affiliations ===
Two other écoles normales supérieures were established in the 20th century: the École Normale Supérieure de Lyon (sciences and humanities); and the École normale supérieure Paris-Saclay (pure and applied sciences, sociology, economics and management, English language). More recently, the fourth école normale supérieure was created in January 2014 under the name of École Normale Supérieure de Rennes (pure and applied sciences, economics and management, law school, sport) in Brittany. All four together form the informal ENS-group.

The École normale supérieure is also an institution of PSL Research University, a union of several higher education institutions, all located in Paris, which aims at achieving cooperation and developing synergies between its member institutions to promote French research abroad. In addition to this, the École normale supérieure cooperates in Atomium Culture, the first permanent platform for European excellence that brings together some of Europe's leading universities, newspapers and businesses. The school is a member of the Conference of University Presidents and of the Conference of Grandes Écoles.

=== Domestic partnerships ===
Its educational project being based on research, ENS seeks to train its students to become researchers. The main objective of the education given is getting a doctorate, and more than 85% of normaliens achieve this. The students are free to choose their own course of study but must at least attain a master's degree in research. Since, traditionally, the institution does not have the powers to grant university degrees, students have to follow courses in other universities in Paris. To this end, ENS cultivates a large number of partnerships and conventions with other higher education institutions to create master's degrees which are co-presided by two institutions. ENS works closely with the École des Hautes Etudes en Sciences Sociales (EHESS), the Paris-Sorbonne University, the Panthéon-Sorbonne University, HEC Paris and ESSEC Business School in particular to deliver joint diplomas to a certain number of students who have followed courses shared between the two institutions. It is also the main partner in the Paris School of Economics project which it has launched along with the EHESS, the École Nationale de la Statistique et de l'Administration Économique (ENSAE) and the École des Ponts. This project seeks to create a unified Master's-level economics school in Paris.

=== International partnerships ===
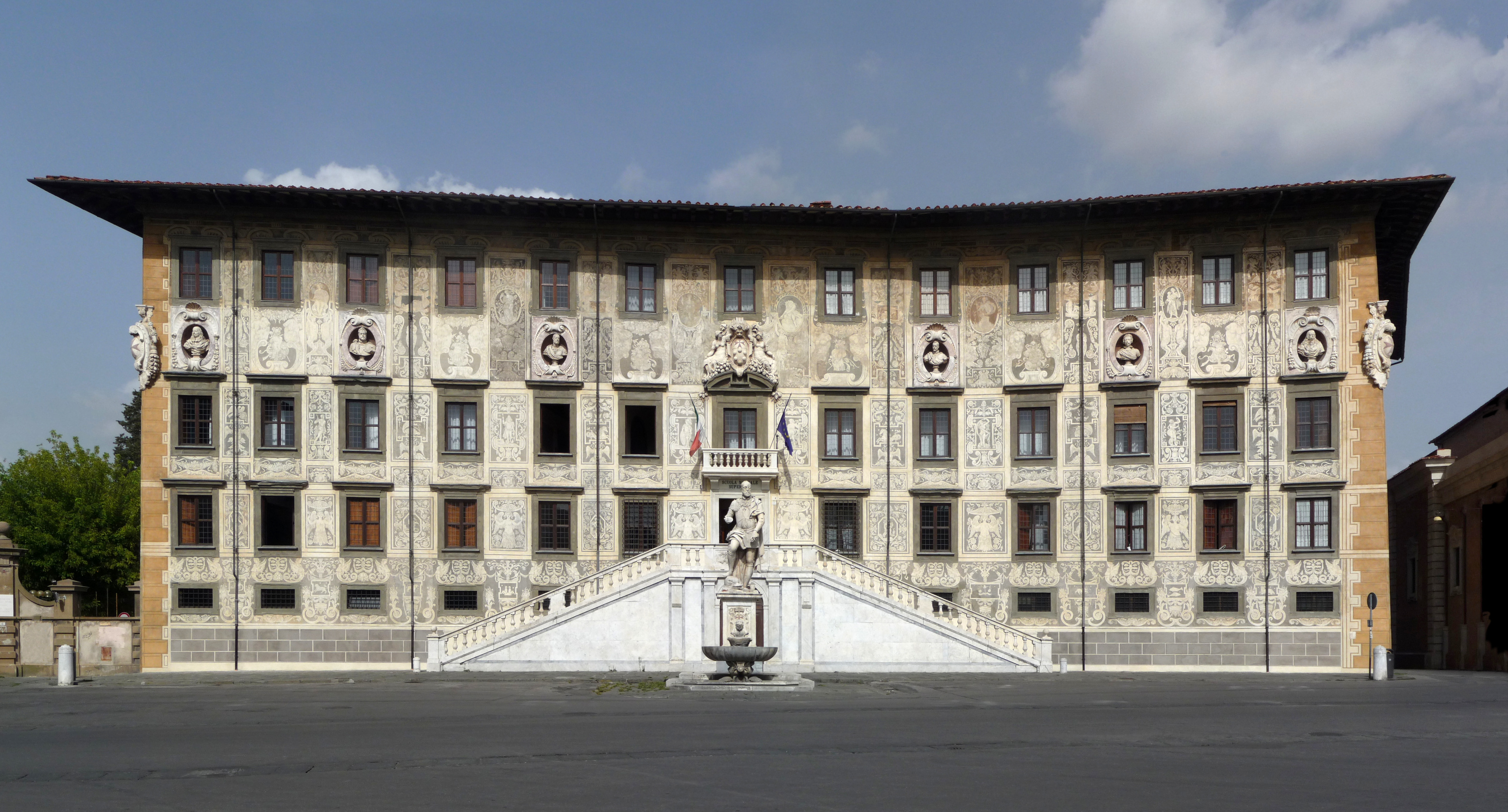
The Scuola Normale Superiore in Pisa, Italy, which was founded as a branch of ENS and retains very close links to it

The Scuola Normale Superiore in Pisa was founded in 1810 as a branch of the École normale supérieure by Napoleon and later gained independence. ENS and its Italian twin have retained very close links since this time and since 1988 a special partnership has 80 normaliens going to Pisa every year while half the class of the SNS spend a year at the Paris school. During its history and due to the far reach of the French Empire during the colonial era, many schools have been created around the world based on the ENS model, from Haiti (in Port-au-Prince) to Vietnam (in Hanoi) to the Maghreb (in Tunis, Casablanca, Oran, and Rabat to name but a few) and Subsaharan Africa (in Nouakchott, Libreville, Yaoundé, Dakar, Niamey, Bangui for example). ENS maintains good relations and close links with these institutions. In 2005, ENS opened a branch at the East China Normal University (ECNU) in Shanghai, whose French name was changed to École normale supérieure de l'Est de la Chine to reflect the agreement, and a joint doctoral program between the two institutions was launched.

ENS welcomes international researchers for one-year stays through the mediation of the Paris Institute of Advanced Research and the Villa Louis-Pasteur. The Blaise Pascal, Marie Curie, Condorcet and Lagrange research places (chaires) also allow researchers from abroad to stay for more than a year at ENS laboratories. ENS also is a member of the Franco-Chinese laboratory Saladyn since 2013. It has been hosting an antenna of New York University's Erich Maria Remarque Institute since 2007.

Furthermore, ENS has partnerships for research at Master's and Doctorate levels, sending its students to universities around the world to complete their tuition. It also shares thesis habilitation with universities abroad, meaning that somes theses can be written with support from both the ENS and one of its partner institutions. It is also customary for students in the literary and linguistic subjects to go to teach for one year in universities abroad with the position of junior fellows. These exchange and cooperation programs link ENS with universities such as the Peking University in China, Freie Universität Berlin in Germany, the universities of Cambridge, Edinburgh and Oxford in the United Kingdom, Trinity College in Dublin, McGill University in Montréal, and the University of California System, Columbia, Cornell, Harvard, Princeton, Stanford, and Yale universities in the United States.

== Academics ==
=== Publishing ===
Since 2001, the École normale supérieure's internet portal, called Diffusion des savoirs ("Spreading knowledge") has offered access to more than 2000 recordings of conferences and seminars that have taken place at the school, in all sciences natural and social. The school also has launched its own short conference platform, Les Ernest, which shows renowned specialists speaking for fifteen minutes on a given subject in a wide scope of disciplines.

In 1975 the school founded its university press, first called Presses de l'ENS then renamed in 1997 to Editions Rue d'Ulm. This press, which operates on a small scale, publishes specialist academic books mainly in the spheres of literature and the social sciences. Some 300 works are available on line on in the press's bookshop, and about 25 new titles are published every year.

=== Foundation ===
In 1986, an ENS foundation was created and recognised as a fondation d'utilité publique by law. It contributes to the development of the school, most notably by encouraging and facilitating the reception of foreign students and researchers. The Foundation, presided by Alain-Gérard Slama, manages some investments into financed positions for foreign researchers in ENS-associated laboratories. It has for example financed the Louis Pasteur villa, situated close by ENS, which welcomes foreign researchers for extended stays. It has also contributed to financing several positions for scientists in ENS laboratories, for instance in research on telecom network security with France Télécom and on "artificial vision" with the Airbus foundation.

=== Rankings and reputation ===
In France, ENS has been regarded since the late 19th century as one of foremost grandes écoles. However, the ENS system is different from that of most higher education systems outside France, thus making it difficult to compare with foreign institutions; in particular, it is much smaller than a typical English collegiate university. It is ranked as the second "small university" worldwide behind California Institute of Technology by the 2016 Times Higher Education Smaller Universities Ranking (a ranking of institutions of fewer than 5000 students). It is generally regarded as the premier French institute for higher education and research, and it is currently ranked first among French universities by the ARWU and Times.

== Notable alumni ==
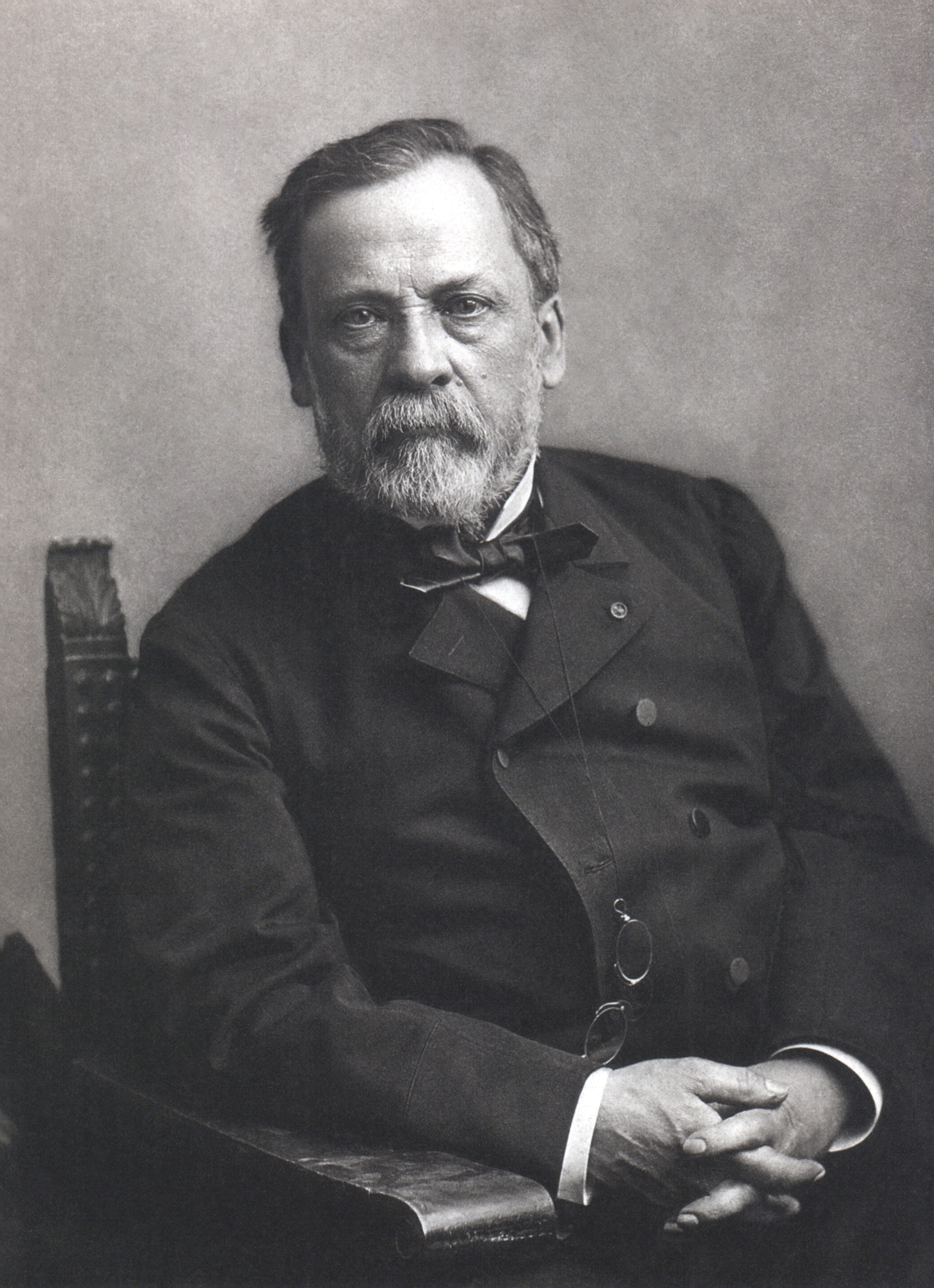
Louis Pasteur was a student at the school before directing it for many years.

Throughout its history, a sizeable number of ENS alumni, some of them known as normaliens, have become notable in many varied fields, both academic and otherwise, ranging from Louis Pasteur, the chemist and microbiologist famed for inventing pasteurisation, to philologist Georges Dumézil, novelist Julien Gracq and socialist Prime Minister Léon Blum.

=== Mathematics and physics ===
Évariste Galois, the founder of Galois theory and group theory, was an early student at ENS, then still called École préparatoire, in the 1820s, at the same time as fellow mathematician Augustin Cournot. Though mathematics continued to be taught at the school throughout the 19th century, its real dominance of the mathematic sphere would not emerge until after the First World War, with a young generation of mathematicians led by André Weil, known for his foundational work in number theory and algebraic geometry (also the brother of fellow student, philosopher Simone Weil). This rejuvenation continued into the 1930s, as exemplified by the 1935 launch of the influential Nicolas Bourbaki project, whose work permeated the field of mathematics throughout the 20th century. In 1940 former student Henri Cartan was appointed professor at the school like his father Élie Cartan, carrying the school's importance in the field still further with his work in algebraic topology. His teaching, which continued until 1965, was vastly influential in shaping his students, who included Yvonne Choquet-Bruhat, Gustave Choquet, Jacques Dixmier, Roger Godement, René Thom and Jean-Pierre Serre. Denis Auroux, a famous symplectic geometer at Harvard University, is also an acclaimed Normalien.

Since the 1936 establishment of the Fields Medal, often called the "Nobel Prize for mathematics", eleven normaliens have been recipients, contributing to ENS's reputation as one of the world's foremost training grounds for mathematicians: Laurent Schwartz, Jean-Pierre Serre (also a recipient of the inaugural Abel Prize in 2003), René Thom, Alain Connes, Jean-Christophe Yoccoz, Pierre-Louis Lions, Laurent Lafforgue, Wendelin Werner, Cédric Villani, Ngô Bảo Châu and Hugo Duminil-Copin. Alexander Grothendieck, also a Fields medallist, though he was not a normalien, received a substantial part of his training at the school. These twelve former students have made ENS the institution with the most Fields medallist alumni of any institution worldwide. Former student Yves Meyer was also awarded the Abel prize.

In addition, eight normaliens have gone on to receive the Nobel Prize in Physics: Claude Cohen-Tannoudji, Pierre-Gilles de Gennes, Albert Fert, Alfred Kastler, Gabriel Lippmann, Louis Néel, Jean Baptiste Perrin and Serge Haroche, while other ENS physicists include such major figures as Paul Langevin, famous for developing Langevin dynamics and the Langevin equation. Alumnus Paul Sabatier won the Nobel Prize in Chemistry.

=== Philosophy ===
Its position as a leading institution in the training of the critical spirit has made ENS into France's premier training ground for future philosophers and producers of what has been called by some "French theory". Its position as a philosophical birthplace can be traced back to its very beginnings, with Victor Cousin a student in the early 19th century. Two ENS philosophers won the Nobel Prize in Literature for their writings, Henri Bergson and Jean-Paul Sartre. Raymond Aron, the founder of French anti-communist thought in the 1960s and Sartre's great adversary, was a student from the same year as Sartre, and they were both near contemporaries of phenomenologist Maurice Merleau-Ponty, musicologist Vladimir Jankélévitch and historian of philosophy Maurice de Gandillac. Among the few female students, philosopher and mystic Simone Weil was accomplishing her years of study at the same time. Jean Hyppolite, the founder of Hegelian studies in France, also studied at the school at this time and later influenced many of its students. Epistemologists Georges Canguilhem and Jean Cavaillès, the latter also known as a Résistance hero, were educated at ENS as well.

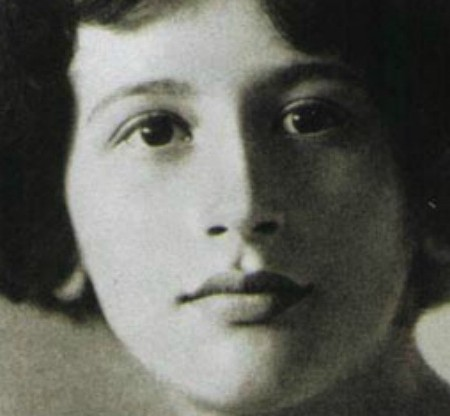
Simone Weil attended the École normale supérieure in the 1920s and beat classmate Simone de Beauvoir to first place in philosophy.

Later, Marxist political thinker Louis Althusser was a student at ENS and taught there for many years, and many of his disciples later became known for their own thought: among them were Étienne Balibar, philosopher Alain Badiou, who still teaches at the school as an emeritus professor, and Jacques Rancière. Still later, in the 1940s and 1950s, the world-renowned thinker Michel Foucault, founder of the history of systems of thought and future professor at the Collège de France was a student a few years ahead of the founder of deconstruction, Jacques Derrida and the thinker of individuation Gilbert Simondon. The tradition continues today through such philosophers as Jacques Bouveresse, Jean-Luc Marion, Claudine Tiercelin, Francis Wolff and Quentin Meillassoux, and the school has also produced prominent public intellectuals like Stéphane Hessel and such New Philosophers as Bernard-Henri Lévy and Benny Lévy.

Contributing to ENS's role as the centre of the structuralist school of thought, alongside Althusser and Foucault, major psychoanalyst and psychiatrist Jacques Lacan taught there in the 1960s, notably giving his course, The Four Fundamental Concepts of Psychoanalysis, in 1964. This period of his teaching is significant as it is the one in which it acquired "a much larger audience" than before and represented a "change of front" from his previous work. During this time the school became a focal point of the École freudienne de Paris, and many of Lacan's disciples were educated there, including psychoanalysts Jacques-Alain Miller and Jean-Claude Milner, the first president of the World Association of Psychoanalysis.

=== History and literature ===
One of the school's foremost specialities has always been the teaching of history, and as such it has produced a large number of renowned historians who have been important in the development of their subject, starting with Numa Denis Fustel de Coulanges, Ernest Lavisse and Jérôme Carcopino, all students of the school in the second half of the nineteenth century who later would come back to direct it. Around the turn of the century two men who would become the founders of the Annales School, Marc Bloch and Lucien Febvre, studied at the school. Jacqueline de Romilly and Pierre Grimal, respectively historians of Ancient Greece and Ancient Rome, were both students at the school starting in 1933. Sinologist Marcel Granet, medievalist Jacques Le Goff, Egyptologist Gaston Maspero, archaeologist Paul Veyne, ancien régime specialist Emmanuel Le Roy Ladurie and Pre-Columbian civilisation anthropologist Jacques Soustelle were all students at the school, as well as Georges Dumézil, who revolutionised comparative philology and mythography with his analyses of sovereignty in Proto-Indo-European religion and formulated the trifunctional hypothesis of social class in ancient societies.

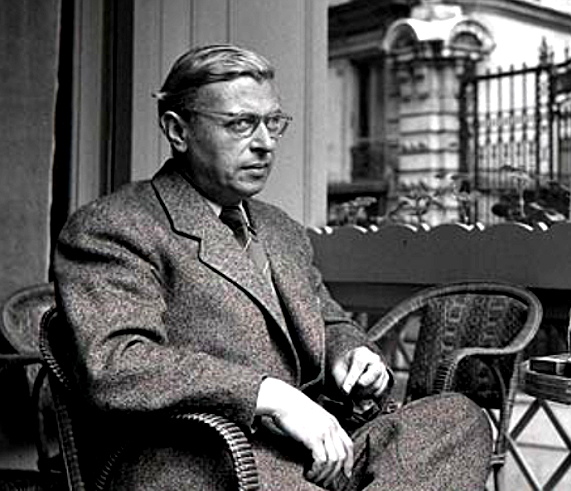
Jean-Paul Sartre attended the school at the same time as his intellectual foe Raymond Aron.

The school has a long-standing reputation as a training ground for men and women of letters, and its alumni include novelist and dramatist Jean Giraudoux, many of whose plays among which The Trojan War Will Not Take Place and Amphitryon 38 have become staple elements of the French theatrical repertory; and acclaimed novelist Julien Gracq, whose 1951 novel The Opposing Shore is now considered a classic. Poet Paul Celan and Nobel Prize in Literature winner Samuel Beckett were both teachers at the school. Jules Romains, the founder of Unanimism, essayists Paul Nizan and Robert Brasillach, novelist Nobel Prize in Literature winner Romain Rolland and poet Charles Péguy are a few other examples of major authors who were educated there. The school has also long been a centre for literary criticism and theory, from one-time director Gustave Lanson to major twentieth-century figures of the field such as Paul Bénichou, Jean-Pierre Richard and Gérard Genette. The founder of the influential Négritude movement, Martinican poet Aimé Césaire, prepared and passed the entrance exam from the Lycée Louis-le-Grand where he was friends with future President of Senegal and fellow Négritude author Léopold Sédar Senghor, who failed the entrance exam. Around this same period Algerian novelist, essayist and filmmaker Assia Djebar, who would become one of the most prominent voices of Arab feminism, was a student at the school, as well as Belgian writer Éric-Emmanuel Schmitt.

=== Social sciences and economics ===
There is a tradition of social sciences at the school, and Émile Durkheim, regarded as one of the founders of the discipline of sociology, was a student at the school in 1879, around the same time as Théodule Ribot, a psychologist well known for developing Ribot's Law. Pierre Bourdieu, who studied dynamics of power in society and its transmission over generations and became a vocal critic of the French system of grandes écoles and notably ENS as the standard-bearer of that system, studied at ENS in the early 1950s, at the same time as his later intellectual adversary, individualist Raymond Boudon, both of them having taken and passed the agrégation in philosophy at the end of their studies at the school. Other major ENS sociologists and anthropologists include Maurice Halbwachs, Alain Touraine and Philippe Descola. The school also has a tradition of geography, with the founder of modern French geography and of the French School of Geopolitics Paul Vidal de La Blache having been a student at the school starting in 1863.

As for economics, its history at the school is less long, as it was not among the subjects first taught at the school. However, Gérard Debreu won the 1983 Bank of Sweden Prize in Economic Sciences in Memory of Alfred Nobel, and there is a growing output of economists from ENS, as evidenced by the young generation of French economists represented by Emmanuel Saez, winner of the 2009 John Bates Clark Medal, Esther Duflo, who won the same medal in 2010 and the Nobel prize in 2019, and Thomas Piketty, author of the 2013 bestseller Capital in the Twenty-First Century. Since its creation in 2000, ten of the twenty recipients of the Prize of the best young French economist have been ENS alumni, including Antoine Bozio (who now teaches at EHESS), Camille Landais (LSE), Emmanuel Farhi (Harvard), Pascaline Dupas (Stanford) and Xavier Gabaix (Harvard).

=== Government and politics ===
ENS has never had a public policy division, but some of its students have become leading statesmen and politicians. Third Republic Prime Ministers Jules Simon, Léon Blum, Édouard Herriot and Paul Painlevé as well as socialist leader Jean Jaurès were early examples of this trend. At this time, quite a few ENS former students and intellectuals were drawn to socialism, such as Pierre Brossolette who became a Resistance hero and a major national leader during World War II. The institution has continued to be seen as a left-wing school since then. Later, as ENS came increasingly to be seen by some as an antechamber to the École nationale d'administration, more young students drawn to politics and public policy began to be attracted to it, such as future President of the Republic Georges Pompidou, Prime Ministers Alain Juppé and Laurent Fabius, and ministers such as Bruno Le Maire and Michel Sapin, former Ministers of Finance of France.

== See also ==
- Grande école
- École normale supérieure (for the generic term)
- École normale supérieure de Lyon
- École normale supérieure Paris-Saclay
- Scuola Normale Superiore di Pisa
- Jeune République
- List of École Normale Supérieure people
- Alumni of the École Normale Supérieure
- Academic staff of the École normale supérieure (Paris)
- École nationale d'administration
- École nationale supérieure des mines de Paris
- Paris Sciences et Lettres – Quartier latin
- Atomium Culture
- Paris School of Economics
- Centrale Graduate School
- (in French) Écoles de l'an III scientifiques
