= École normale supérieure de Lyon =

Higher learning institution in Lyon, France

- Motto: L'enseignement par la recherche, pour la recherche
- Motto in English: Education through research, for research
- Type: Grande école (École normale supérieure)
- Established: 1987, 2010 in its current form
- Affiliations: University of Lyon
- Budget: €130 million
- President: Emmanuel Trizac
- Academic staff: 528
- Students: 2,361
- Doctoral students: 462
- Location: Lyon, France; 45.729734°N 4.826875°E
- Colours: Red; Black
- Website: www.ens-lyon.fr

ENS de Lyon (France)

The École normale supérieure de Lyon (French pronunciation: [ekɔl nɔʁmal sypeʁjœʁ də ljɔ̃]; also known as ENS de Lyon, ENSL or Normale Sup' Lyon) is a French grande école located in the city of Lyon. It is one of the four prestigious écoles normales supérieures in France. The school is composed of two academic units—Arts and Sciences—with campuses in Lyon, near the confluence of the Rhône and Saône rivers.

ENS de Lyon's students usually enjoy a special civil servant status in the wake of highly competitive exams, providing they pursue careers in public service. Although it maintains extensive connections with the University of Lyon and external research institutions, including the CNRS, the school remains independent.

== History ==
=== Training teachers for normal schools ===
L'École normale supérieure de Lyon is the descendant of two top educational institutions founded by Jules Ferry:

- L'École normale supérieure de Fontenay-aux-Roses, for girls, founded in 1880.
- L'École normale supérieure de Saint-Cloud, for boys, founded in 1882.

Recruiting among the most brilliant French students, these two schools used to train the professors of the French normal schools. Whereas these schools were largely regarded as meritocratic, their sisters – the eldest, l'École Normale Supérieure de la Rue d'Ulm, and her feminine counterpart, l'École normale supérieure de jeunes filles de Sèvres -, which trained academics, were de facto dedicated to the heirs of the Parisian elites.

=== A shift towards secondary and higher education ===
Following a reform of normal schools, the decree of February 19, 1945, granted both institutions the title of Écoles normales préparatoires à l'enseignement secondaire. The schools' purpose changed with the growth of the French education system. By 1956, the length of studies was increased to four years in order to institute a preparation for the agrégation – a prestigious teaching qualification. Increasingly opening up to research, they aligned their development strategies with those of the ENS Ulm and Sèvres.

=== The relocation in Lyon ===
As part of France's process of decentralisation, the Schools' scientific departments moved in 1987 to Gerland, an old industrial district of Lyon, in the premises of the current Monod campus. The relocated institution was named ENS Lyon. Humanities students remained in the Parisian suburbs within the coeducational École normale supérieure de Fontenay-Saint-Cloud. In 2000, this school, informally renamed École normale supérieure lettres et sciences humaines, was transferred to the new Descartes Campus also located in Gerland.

On the first of January 2010, the two branches merged to become a single institution, retaining the name École normale supérieure de Lyon.

== Academics ==
ENS de Lyon is a Grande École, a French institution of higher education that is separate from, but parallel and connected to the main framework of the French public university system. Similar to the Ivy League in the United States, Oxbridge in the UK, and C9 League in China, Grandes Écoles are elite academic institutions that admit students through an extremely competitive process. Grandes Écoles typically they have much smaller class sizes and student bodies than public universities in France, and many of their programs are taught in English. While most Grandes Écoles are much more expensive than French universities, ENS de Lyon only charges a relatively small fee (dependent on the student's income) in addition to the standard university tuition fee, even though it increased a little bit in 2025. International internships, study abroad opportunities, and close ties with government and the corporate world are a hallmark of the Grandes Écoles. Degrees from École normale supérieure are accredited by the Conférence des Grandes Écoles and awarded by the Ministry of National Education (France) (French: Le Ministère de L'éducation Nationale). Alums go on to occupy elite positions within government, administration, and corporate firms in France.

Teaching at the ENS de Lyon is organised through twelve main departments, spread over the two campuses:

=== Monod Campus: Natural and Experimental Sciences Departments ===
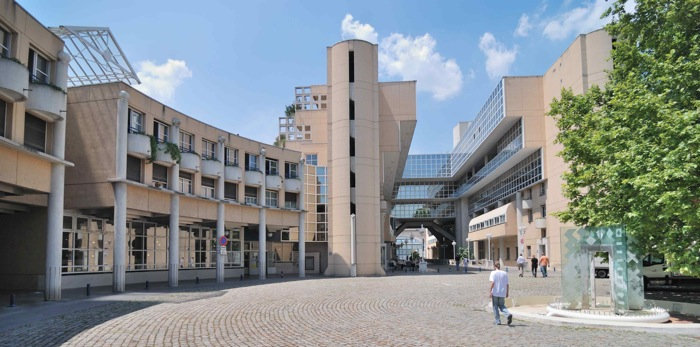
Jacques Monod Campus – Sciences

- Biology
- Chemistry
- Computer science
- Earth science
- Mathematics
- Physics

=== Descartes Campus: Humanities and Social Sciences Departments ===
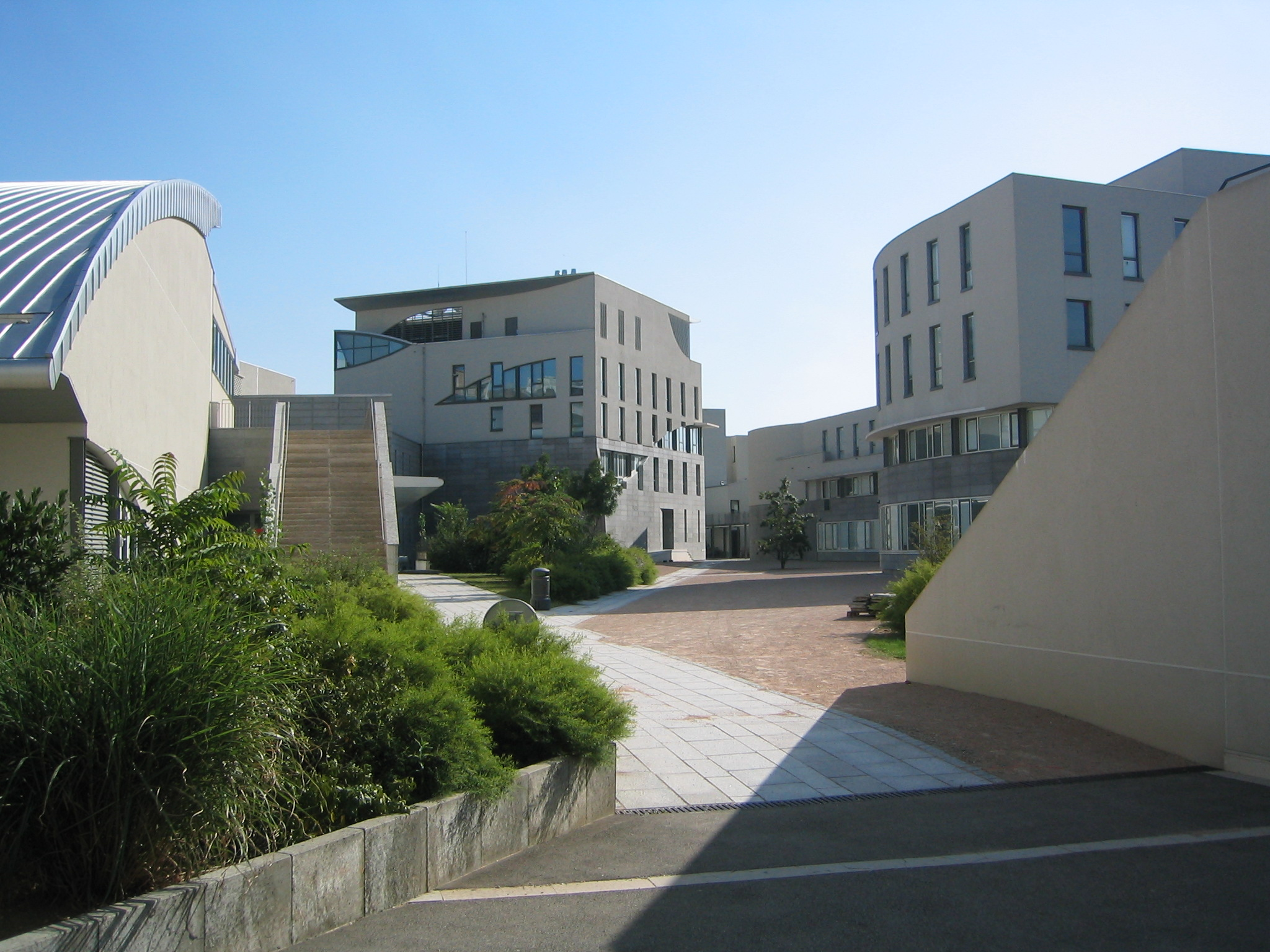
René Descartes Campus – Humanities

- Arts and humanities: Musicology, Cinema and Theater studies, Classics and modern French Literature
- Economics
- Education and digital humanities
- Foreign languages, Literatures and Civilisations: Arabic, Chinese, English, German, Italian, Spanish and Russian
- Human sciences: Philosophy, Cognitive science and Anthropology
- Social sciences: Sociology, History, Geography, Political science and International studies

== Research ==
Twenty-three of ENSL's research groups have contractual ties to major research organizations, notably the CNRS and INSERM. ENSL is a member of several advanced research networks and competitive clusters, including Lyon BioPôle, and hosts an Institute for Advanced Study, the Collegium de Lyon.

=== Sciences ===
- Institute of Functional Genomics of Lyon (IGFL)
- Laboratory of molecular and cell biology (LBMC)
- Laboratory of plant reproduction and development (RDP)
- Laboratory of human virology (VIRO)
- Laboratory of Earth Sciences (LST)
- Joliot-Curie interdisciplinary laboratory (LJC)
- Laboratory of Pure and Applied Mathematics (UMPA)
- Laboratory of chemistry (LCH)
- Computer science laboratory (LIP)
- Laboratory of physics
- Astronomy research center (CRAL)
- Center for high field Nuclear Magnetic Resonance (CRMN)

=== Humanities ===
- C2SO – Communication, culture and society
- Institute for the History of Classical Thought, from Humanism to the Enlightenment
- Institute of East Asian Studies (IAO)
- Interactions, Corpuses, Learning and Representations
- Interdisciplinary approach to the logics of power in medieval Iberian societies
- Literature, Ideologies and Représentations in the Eighteenth and Nineteenth Centuries
- Rhône-Alpes Centre for Historical Research
- Socialisation Research Group
- Triangle: Action, Discourses, Economic and Political Thought
- History and Archaeology of the Medieval Christian and Islamic Worlds
- Economic Theory and Analysis Group

== Students ==
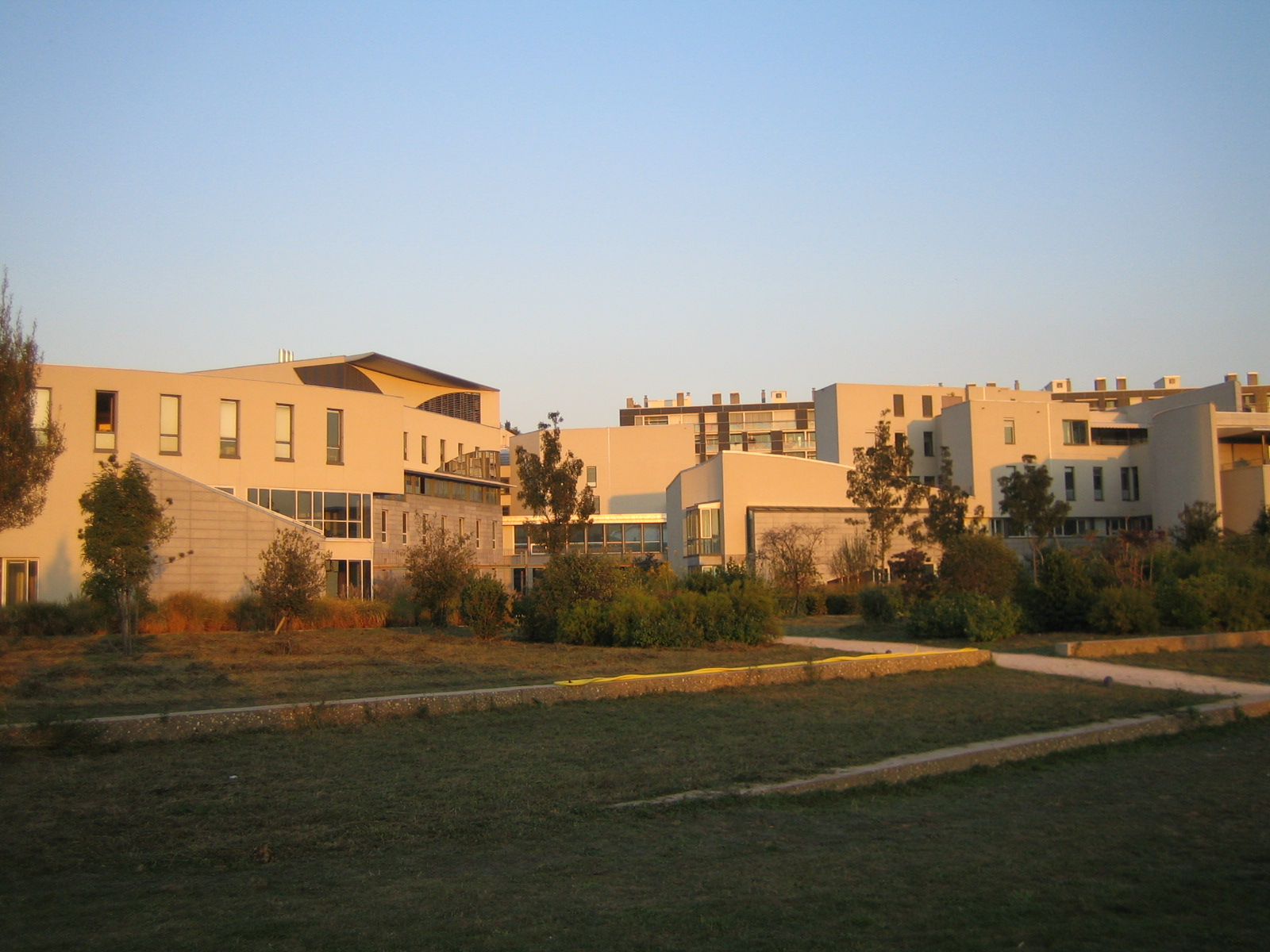
View from the meadows of the "René Descartes" Campus (Humanities)

=== Normaliens-élèves ===
ENSL retains its close links to the classes préparatoires which prepare high-level students – previously selected on the basis of their academic record – for the competitive entrance examination that is taken after two years of pluridisciplinary undergraduate-level study.

Students who succeed in the entrance examinations, which attract some 6000 candidates for 228 positions, are known as normaliens-élèves; those who are from France or another European Union country are considered trainee public servants, and receive a salary for their studies during 4 years. A second entrance examination is also open to students who have not gone through the classes préparatoires system.

In return of their salary, they have to serve in public services for 10 years.

=== Normaliens-étudiants ===
Entry to ENSL is not restricted to normaliens-élèves. Students may also apply through a separate admissions process based on academic prowess. The normaliens-étudiants are not public servants, but their training and diploma are the same as those of the normaliens-élèves.

=== Auditeurs de masters ===
An auditeur de master is someone who has been admitted at the ENSL at the master level. By opposition to the normaliens-élèves and the normaliens-étudiants, they don't have the title of Normalien and are just eligible to a master's degree. They can't obtain the ENSL diploma.

== Studies ==
=== First year ===
Students prepare the third year of Licence, the equivalent of a UK Bachelor's degree. The ENS de Lyon offers numerous courses which are conceived as preparations for Masters.

=== Second and third years ===
Students prepare in two years their Master's degree. 5 research Masters are proposed in Sciences, 36 in Humanities.

=== Fourth year ===
During this year, students can prepare the agrégation teacher recruitment examination in 16 different subjects. Students can also start their PhD, go studying for one year or more in a foreign country, or follow during one year courses in other subjects.

=== Gap years ===
Between the first and fourth year, normaliens can also spend up to 2 free years called années sans solde, during which they can study other disciplines or do a long internship, sometimes in foreign countries. Each année sans solde project needs the approval of the ENSL supervisors.

=== Doctoral studies ===
The ENS de Lyon welcomes over 400 PhD students from all over the world. Normaliens can apply to specific doctoral contracts, as long as the thesis is undertaken within a French research institution.

== Rankings ==
| Times Higher Education – top 20 small universities worldwide | 2018 | 2019 | 2020 | 2021 | 2022 | 2023 | 2024 |
|---|---|---|---|---|---|---|---|
| École normale supérieure de Lyon | 5th | 7th | 9th | 11th | 14th | 12th | 7th |

The 2026 QS World University Rankings ranked the ENSL 205th university in the world.

However, international rankings do not suit well the French academic system, where research organizations are often independent from universities. Moreover, the ENS are small institutions favouring education quality rather than research productivity. For instance, some French universities are better ranked than the ENS, even though the different écoles normales supérieures are considered to be among the highest French academic institutions due to their endowment, prestige and selectivity.

== Famous people ==
=== Faculty ===
- Jean Giraud (1936–2007) – mathematician
- Francis Albarède (born 1937) – geochemist (Arthur Holmes Medal, 2001)
- Jean-Pierre Hansen (born 1942) – chemist (Rumford Medal, 2006)
- Jean-Claude Sikorav (born 1957) – mathematician
- Hélène Miard-Delacroix (born 1959) – historian and Germanist
- Emmanuel Giroux (born 1961) – mathematician
- Claire Mathieu (born 1965) – computer scientist and mathematician
- Cédric Villani (born 1973) – mathematician (Fields Medal, 2010)
- Laure Saint-Raymond (born 1975) – mathematician (European Mathematical Society Prize, 2008)
- Sophie Morel (born 1979) – mathematician (European Mathematical Society Prize, 2012), first woman getting tenured in mathematics at Harvard.
- Emmanuel Grenier (born 1970) – mathematician (European Mathematical Society Prize, 2000)

=== Alumni ===
- Laurent Freidel – theoretical physicist
- Georges Calas – mineralogist
- Catherine Bréchignac (born 1946) – physicist (Holweck Medal, 2003)
- Jacques Prost born 1946) – physicist
- François Gauthier (born 1953) – diplomat, Ambassador of France to Ecuador
- Étienne Ghys (born 1954) – mathematician, (Clay Award for Dissemination, 2015)
- Anne L'Huillier (born 1958) – physicist (Nobel Prize, 2023)
- Anne-Marie Descôtes (born 1959) – diplomat, Ambassador of France to Germany
- Jakob von Weizsäcker (born 1970, in Heidelberg) – German economist and politician
- Mazarine Pingeot (born 1974) – writer, journalist and professor
- Eric Monnet (born 1983) – economist (Best Young Economist of France, 2021)
- Alessio Figalli (born 1984) – Italian mathematician (Fields Medal, 2018)

=== Recipients of honorary degree ===
- Joseph Stiglitz (born 1943) – American economist (Nobel Prize, 2001)
- Yakov Eliashberg (born 1946) – American mathematician
- Paul Seymour (mathematician) (born 1950) – British mathematician
- Ole Petter Ottersen (born 1955) – Norwegian physician and neuroscientist
- Dennis Meadows (born 1942) – American Professor of Systems Management, coauthor of The Limits to Growth
- Abhijit Banerjee (born 1961) – Indian American economist (Nobel Prize, 2019)
- Hartmut Rosa (born 1965) – German sociologist
