= Susumu Yokota discography =

Susumu Yokota was a Japanese electronic music composer. He released under many aliases, often switching between different aliases for different record labels.

== Susumu Yokota ==
Albums

- Acid Mt. Fuji (1994)
- Magic Thread (1998)
- 1998 (1998)
- Image 1983–1998 (1998)
- 1999 (1999)
- Sakura (1999)
- Mix (1999)
- Zero (2000)
- Zero Remixes (2001)
- Grinning Cat (2001)
- Will (2001)
- Sound of Sky (2002)
- The Boy and the Tree (2002)
- Over Head (2003)
- Laputa (2003)
- Baroque (2004)
- Symbol (2004)
- Wonder Waltz (2006)
- Triple Time Dance (2006)
- Love or Die (2007)
- Mother (2009)
- Kaleidoscope (2010)
- Dreamer (2012)
- Cloud Hidden (2019, recorded circa 2002)

EPs

- Mix (2000)
- Zero Remixes EP Vol. 1 (2000)
- Zero Remixes EP Vol. 2 (2001)
- Zero Remixes EP Vol. 3 (2001)
- Arm (2002)

Singles

- Blood of Angel (1998)
- Future Memory (1999)
- Come on My World (2000)
- Could Heaven Ever Be Like This (2001)
- King of Darkness (2002)
- Rainbow Flag (2003)

Compilation

- Skintone Collection (2007)

== Anima Mundi ==
Albums

- Anima Beat (1996)

EPs

- Hebula (1996)

== Ebi ==
Albums

- Zen (1994)
- Ten (1995)

EPs

- Hi (1993)
- Liveacid (1994)
- Fat Shrimp (1995)

== Frankfurt-Tokyo-Connection ==
EPs

- Vol. 1 (1993)

== Prism ==
Albums

- Metronome Melody (1995)
- Fallen Angel (1997)

EPs

- Metronome Melody EP (1996)

== Ringo ==
Albums

- Plantation (1995)

== Stevia ==
Albums

- Fruits of the Room (1997)
- Greenpeace (1998)

== Tenshin ==
EPs

- Brainthump (1992)

== Yin & Yang ==
EPs

- A Magic Cap in the Sky (1994)
- Grand (1997)

== Yokota ==
Albums

- Frankfurt Tokyo Connection (1993)
- Cat, Mouse and Me (1996)
- Psychic Dance (2009)

Singles

- Panicwaves (1994)
- Wait for a Day (1997)
- One Way (1997)

== 246 ==
EPs

- Vol. 1 (1994)
- Vol. 2 (1995)

== with Ray Castle and Take Tokuda (Sonic Sufi) ==
Albums

- Sacramental (1995)

EPs

- Optimum Flux (1995)

== with Ray Castle (Mantaray) ==
Albums

- Numinous Island (1995)

== with Rothko ==
Albums

- Distant Sounds of Summer (2005)

EPs

- Waters Edge (2002)

== with Thomas Bit (Bamboo Data) ==
Albums

- Empty Mirror (1996)
- Tone of Water, Colors of J-Sky (2000)

EPs

- Bamboo Data (1996)
