= Symbol (disambiguation) =

A symbol is something that represents an idea, a process, or a physical entity.

Symbol may also refer to:

== Computing ==
- Identifier (computer languages), a data structure used by a language translator
- Symbol (data), the smallest amount of data transmitted at a time in digital communications
- Symbol (programming), a primitive data type in many programming languages used to name variables and functions
- Symbol (typeface), a font designed by Aldo Novarese (1982), one of the four standard PostScript fonts
- Debug symbol, debugging information used to troubleshoot computer programs, analyze memory dumps
- Unicode character, symbols which can be represented and displayed with standard code numbers

== Film and television ==
- Symbol (film), a movie by Hitoshi Matsumoto

== Logic ==
- Symbol (formal), a string, used in formal languages and formal systems
- Symbol grounding, the problem of how symbols acquire meaning

== Music ==
- Symbol (album), a 2005 album by Japanese electronica musician Susumu Yokota
- Symbol (Prince album), unofficial name for his 1992 album
- Symbols (album), a 1997 album from the industrial rock band KMFDM
- Symbol (choir), a choir in Romania
- The Symbol (album), a 2007 album by Japanese girl group Shanadoo
- The Symbols, an English pop music band
- Symbol Records, a record label, part of Sue Records

== Theology ==
- Creed, a statement of shared beliefs of a religious community
  - Nicene Creed or Symbolum Nicaenum, the profession of faith or creed that is most widely used in Christian liturgy

== Other uses ==
- Symbol (chemistry), an abbreviation that identifies a chemical element
- Symbol (semiotics), a sign that signifies through arbitrary social convention
- Symbol (mathematics)
- Symbol (metric system), a representation of a metric unit independent of language
- Symbol (number theory), various generalizations of the Legendre symbol
- Symbol, Kentucky, an unincorporated community in Laurel County, Kentucky, United States
- Ticker symbol, an abbreviation used to uniquely identify publicly traded shares of a particular stock
- Renault Symbol, a subcompact sedan produced by the French automaker Renault
- Symbol Technologies, an AIDC company based in Holtsville, New York, United States
- Casablanca Conference codenamed SYMBOL, the conference to plan the Allied European strategy for the next phase of World War II

== See also ==
- Simbolul, a Romanian literary magazine
- Symbolic (disambiguation)
- Symbolism (disambiguation)
- Cymbal, round metal plates used as percussion instruments
- List of symbols
