= Tells (band) =

British experimental band

Tells are a British experimental band formed by the former core members of Delicate AWOL, Jim Version and Caroline Ross.

== Sound ==
Tell's sound mixes aspects of avant-garde folk music with art rock, jazz and improvised structures. Their music has a strong textural basis with a loose approach to rhythm. Vocals can be either melodious, murmured or incantatory and are inspired by Ross' devout love of traditional vocal music (including English, Indian, Scottish and Bulgarian forms). The band's press release commented "the majority of tracks wouldn’t sound out of place on the soundtrack to a 21st-century take on cult horror flick The Wicker Man".

== History ==
=== Emergence from Delicate AWOL ===
Jim Version (guitar, piano, vocals, instruments, production) and Caroline Ross (vocals, bass, guitar, flute, percussion, instruments) had formed art rock/post-rock band Delicate AWOL together in 1998. Over the course of six years, the band released two albums and numerous EPs and evolved from an abrasive urban indie sound to a looser, groove-and-ambient orientated approach drawing on jazz and psychedelia.

Following Delicate AWOL's relocation from London to Aberdeenshire in 2004 the band began to disintegrate. Bass player Michael Donnelly, percussion/synthesizer player Ben Page and drummer Tom Page eventually returned to London to join Rothko. Reduced to a duo, Version and Ross discovered that the new music which they were making did not suit the former band format. They dissolved Delicate AWOL and formed Tells as a looser collaborative project with themselves at the centre. Based at their own residential Steadling Studios, and now involved in various local community activities, they began to record new music with additional contributions coming from local musicians and volunteer workers. The project thrived on this situation with Ross reporting "two of the band members are 17 years old, and one is 61!"

=== Hope Your Wounds Heal ===
Tells released their debut album, Hope Your Wounds Heal, on Fire Records in 2006. Contributors on this record were Ryoko Toyama and Laura Desbrisay (backing vocals), Philip Johnston (bass) and (flute), Neil Scolley (drums), and former Delicate AWOL member Jo Wright (trumpet).

The album received positive reviews, being hailed as "a beautiful post-rock/avant-jazz masterpiece that will give your ears a real workout ", "a pure gem to warm the cockles ", "(a) remarkable album... bigger than the sum of its influences ", and "slowcore's finest edition since Low ". Even some of the less enthusiastic reviews found the album intriguing - in one instance it was described as "ambitious, if patchy... a school orchestra playing a Mars Volta song".

== Current/future activity ==
Having left Scotland in the late 2000s, and with the band now divided between Cheltenham and London, Tells are currently on hold but plan to record more material in the future.

In June 2006, Ross mentioned future plans for a piano-and-vocal album and a four-song download EP (neither of which have yet materialised).

== Related projects ==
The members of Tells maintain a link with Rothko, and Caroline Ross has recorded a collaborative album with Rothko called A Place Between (2005).

Ross has also recorded two tracks for Susumu Yokota’s Distant Sounds of Summer album and worked with Mark Raudva (Shriekback) and Mountain Men Anonymous. In 2009, she joined the live lineup of Brighton band Woodpecker Wooliams, singing and playing "flute, glock, omnichord, cheese-grater etc."

Jim Version has engineered and co-produced various records by other artists at Steading Studios, including albums by Bonnie Prince Billy, Alasdair Roberts, Kitchen Cynics, Scatter, Hookers Green No1, The Great Depression, Tanakh, Eric Euan, Donal Brown and John Kenny.
