= Mary Ann Sieghart =

English author, journalist and radio presenter (born 1961)

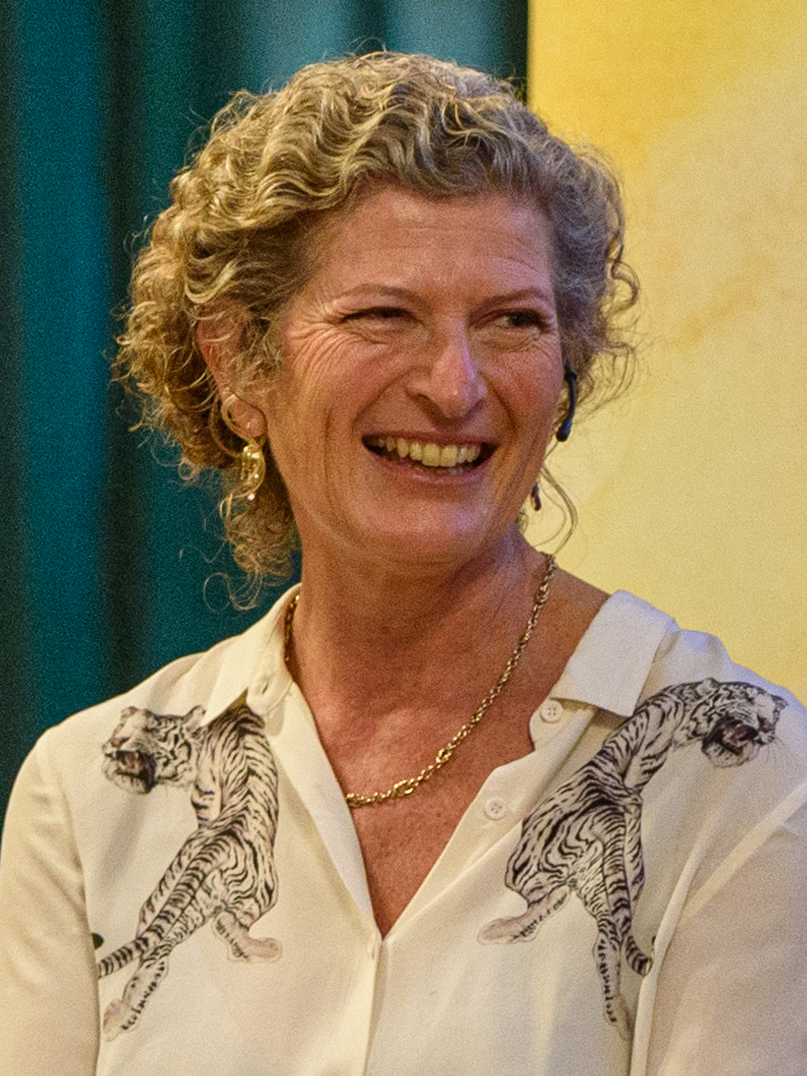
- Sieghart in 2021
- Born: 6 August 1961 (age 65); Hammersmith, London, England
- Education: Wadham College, Oxford
- Occupations: Journalist, broadcaster
- Notable credit(s): The Times; Newshour; The Independent
- Spouse: David Prichard
- Children: 2
- Relatives: William Sieghart (brother)

Mary Ann Corinna Howard Sieghart (born 6 August 1961) is an English author, journalist, consultant, radio presenter and former assistant editor of The Times, where she wrote columns about politics, social affairs and life in general. She has also written a weekly political column in The Independent. Her best-selling book, The Authority Gap: Why Women Are Still Taken Less Seriously Than Men, and What We Can Do About It, was published by Transworld/Doubleday in July 2021. She now runs The Authority Gap Consultancy, which helps organisations narrow and close their authority gaps.

On BBC Radio 4, she has been a presenter of Start the Week and has also presented Fallout, Analysis, Profile, One to One and Beyond Westminster, as well as many one-off documentaries. She is a visiting professor at King's College London and chaired the Social Market Foundation, an independent think tank, from 2010 to 2020. She has been a non-executive director of the Ofcom Content Board, a member of the Tate Modern Council, and is currently a Non-Executive Director of the Guardian Media Group, Senior Independent Director of a FTSE 250 investment trust, Pantheon International and a Trustee of the Esmée Fairbairn Foundation and the Kennedy Memorial Trust. She was Chair of Judges for the Women's Prize for Fiction 2022. In 2018, she was named as one of the Female FTSE 100 Women to Watch.

She was appointed a Visiting Fellow of All Souls College, Oxford, for the academic year 2018–19, where she researched The Authority Gap. She has since been an Associate Member of Nuffield College, Oxford (2019–20) and a Senior Academic Visitor at Oriel College, Oxford (2020-21). She is now a visiting professor at King's College London.

== Early life ==
Sieghart was born in Hammersmith, London in 1961, the daughter of Paul Sieghart, a Vienna-born human rights lawyer, campaigner, broadcaster and author, and Felicity Ann Olga Howard Sieghart (née Baer), chairman of the National Association for Gifted Children, magistrate and later managing director of the Aldeburgh Cinema. Her father, whose parents divorced when he was two, was raised Catholic as his maternal grandfather Rudolf Sieghart (né Singer) had converted from Judaism. This did not prevent them from being persecuted by the Nazis, thus he and his mother fled to Switzerland and then England.

Her older brother is William Sieghart. Sieghart was privately educated at both Cobham Hall School and Bedales School. She won a scholarship to Wadham College, Oxford, when she was 16, and graduated with a first-class degree in Philosophy, politics and economics in 1982.

== Career ==
Sieghart's abilities were admired by Bill Deedes. Deedes hired her to work at The Daily Telegraph during the 1980 university summer vacation, where she spent time sub-editing, working on the "Peterborough" column and on features. She returned for subsequent vacations and again took on various roles, including writing some leaders. Deedes notes that "Let loose on the leader page, Mary Ann wove a sometimes startling liberal thread through the Daily Telegraph's blue tapestry." He offered her a job on graduation but simultaneously advised her to apply elsewhere because the Daily Telegraph was in financial trouble.

After Oxford, Sieghart joined the Financial Times, where she became Eurobond Correspondent and then a Lex columnist. She spent a summer in 1984 working for The Washington Post, as the Laurence Stern Fellow. From the FT, she was recruited to be City Editor of Today newspaper at its launch in 1986. When it was taken over by Tiny Rowland, she moved to The Economist to be Political Correspondent. She also presented The World This Week on Channel 4.

In 1988, she joined The Times, as editor of the comment pages. During her time there, she was also Arts Editor, Chief Political leader-writer and acting editor of the paper on Mondays. In 1995, she chaired the revival of The Brains Trust on BBC2.

In 2003, Bill Hagerty, editor of the British Journalism Review, described Sieghart as "very talented" but criticised her assumption that broadsheet journalism in newspapers such as The Times was intrinsically better or more effective than tabloid journalism. In 2007, she left The Times to pursue a portfolio career. From 2010 to 2012, she wrote the main opinion column in The Independent on Mondays.

Sieghart is a regular broadcaster. She was an occasional presenter of Start the Week on Radio 4 and presented Newshour on the BBC World Service from 2008 to 2010: she has also presented Analysis, Fallout, Profile, One to One and Beyond Westminster on Radio 4. She has often appeared on programmes such as Question Time, Any Questions, Newsnight, Today, The World Tonight and Woman's Hour. She was a regular co-presenter of Start the Week during the time Melvyn Bragg was the programme's main presenter and has been a guest presenter of The Week in Westminster and Dispatch Box.

== Other activities ==
Sieghart is Founding Partner of The Authority Gap Consultancy, Visiting Professor at King's College London, Non-Executive Director of the Guardian Media Group, and Senior Independent Director of Pantheon International. She was Chair of Judges of the Women's Prize for Fiction 2022. Until recently, she was chair of the Social Market Foundation, and also sat on the boards of the Henderson Smaller Companies Investment Trust, DLN Digital Ltd, the Council of Tate Modern and the Content Board of Ofcom. She is senior trustee of the Kennedy Memorial Trust, trustee of the Esmée Fairbairn Foundation, and has previously served as a trustee of the Radcliffe Trust, Heritage Lottery Fund, steering committee member of the No Campaign and New Europe, member of the Advisory Board of the Social Studies Faculty at Oxford University and other voluntary posts.

== Personal life ==
Sieghart, eligible for both Austrian and German citizenship, applied for German in 2018.

Sieghart suffers from prosopagnosia, which makes it difficult to recognize familiar faces. Her mother, husband, and one of her children suffer from the same condition.
