= Nick Abson =

British chemist

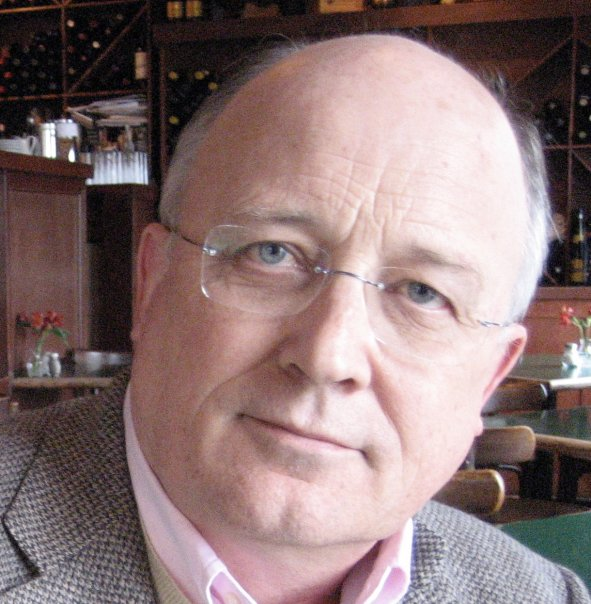
- Nick Abson
- Born: Michael Nicholas Drinan; December 22, 1946 (age 79); Devon, England
- Years active: 41 Years
- Known for: Fuel Cell Development, Music Video/Television Director

Nicholas Michael Abson (born Michael Nicholas Drinan; 22 December 1946 in England) is a British chemist, businessman, music video producer, and filmmaker. Born to parents Pamela Mileece Drinan (née l'Anson) and Michael Patrick Drinan, after emigrating to Canada in 1956, Abson was adopted by his then step-father and re-christened Nicholas Michael Abson.

In 1961, Abson moved to New York City, where he attended Brooklyn Technical High School. He then went on to attend the City University of New York CUNY Manhattan and Richmond College.

In 1978, his daughter Mileece was born, a recording artist and advanced music composer, followed by his son Miles, and then Lancelot.

== Work ==
=== Fuel cell industry ===
In 1991, Abson started a series for the BBC centering on a Belgian fuel cell company, Elenco. After becoming engrossed with the technology, when it entered administration he rebuilt Elenco from 2 employees to 200 and re-branded it as ZeTek Plc. ZeTek would go on to become Europe’s largest fuel cell company pioneering fuel cell London Taxis in 1998 and a second generation fuel cell designed for automated production, ending the hand production previously required. The first planned expansion began in Porz, near Cologne, early August 2000 and the second plant at Oak Ridge, Tennessee at the Oak Ridge National Laboratory in 2001, and a third in Lebanon, Pennsylvania, until it lost its investors immediately following the World Trade Center tragedy later that same year. He resurrected the company as Cenergie Plc and provided shares for all but a few of the 500 ZeTek shareholders. Following a series of cyber and other commercially driven attacks, Abson resigned.

Abson continues work on fuel-cell development by publishing papers while working pro-bono for a number of organisations and universities. Citing his experiences with Cenergie, he now writes and campaigns for greater scrutiny of UK money-laundering activities and industrial espionage.

=== Music ===
In 1970, Abson returned to Britain and launched Freerange Sound Studios using funds earned from documentaries. He worked with the British Film Institute on productions including The Stonemen and The Earthmovers, which document St. Paul's Cathedral's masons and the reclamation of Britain's largest coal tip (respectively).

Abson went on to make many music concert films during the 1970s, starting with Dr. Feelgood's Going Back Home and ending with the Ramones' New Year's Concert. He pioneered music videos with artists such as Stevie Wonder, Kate Bush, The Damned, Queen and Lena Lovitch while Covent Garden's Freerange recorded Gary Numan, The Sex Pistols, Patti Smith and The Slits, supporting musicians by subsidizing them with film profits.

In 1979, he closed Freerange to pursue careers outside of the music industry after his longtime business partner Neville Wills who died 1981, following health issues (aged 36). Wills was also a member of the band The Konrads alongside David Bowie.

==== Music videos ====
- The Alan Parsons Project "I Robot"
- Diana Ross "My Old Piano"
- Stevie Wonder "Happy Birthday", "Master Blaster"
- Kate Bush "Wuthering Heights"
- Queen "We Will Rock You"
- Silicon Teens "Memphis"
- Lena Lovitch "Lucky Number"
- Eddie and the Hot Rods "Out of the City"
- Baccarat "Loredo"
- The Damned "New Rose"
- Graham Parker & The Rumour "New York Shuffle"

==== Concert films ====
- James Galway
- The Ramones
- Dr. Feelgood
- Graham Parker
- Motörhead
- Hawkwind

=== Television career ===
Abson's strong political and social interests led him to television with current affairs programs such as Left Right and Centre, Public Eye, and The World This Week. He later went on to direct light entertainment programs like Krypton Factor, Countdown, Catchphrase and Fraggle Rock. His interest in science led to series such as Where's There's Life, Discovery, Fun and Games, The Haley Comet Show and Real World. Between 1980 and 1990, he directed more than 2,000 network shows.

==== Television programs ====
- News and Current Affairs
  - Public Eye
  - Left Right and Centre
  - Jimmy Young Show
  - The World This Week
  - The Story of Fun and Games
- Light entertainment
  - Countdown
  - Krypton Factor
  - Fraggle Rock
  - Paperchase
- Science
  - Where There's Life
  - Discovery
  - Fun and Games
  - Real World

==== Documentaries ====
- Stonemen of Saint Paul's
- The Earthmovers
- If It Ain't Stiff…
- Lean Burn Engine
- Going Back Home
