= Delicate AWOL =

UK musical group

Delicate AWOL were a British experimental rock band active between 1998 and 2005. They were notable for their cross-pollination of various musical forms (including indie rock, art rock, post-rock, jazz, Latin and out-rock), their links with British post-rock band Rothko, their activities in promoting the London underground music scene of the early 2000s, and for establishing the brief-lived but well-regarded indie record label Day Release. Members of the band later went on to Avant-folk duo Tells, the later Rothko line-up and Rocketnumbernine.

== Sound and influences ==
Between the formation and demise of the band, Delicate AWOL's sound underwent an extensive transformation. Originally favouring a harsh guitar-orientated urban indie sound, the band passed through a more ethereal art rock mid-period and ultimately arrived at a more groove-orientated jazz-influenced sound incorporating electronica, elements of Brazilian music and electric-period inspired by Miles Davis.

At various times, the band cited influences including Mogwai, Cocteau Twins, Low, art rock from 1990s Chicago (such as Tortoise and The For Carnation) and Montreal (Godspeed You! Black Emperor) and 1970s Britain (King Crimson). Reviewers sometimes compared Delicate AWOL to bands like Stereolab, Bardo Pond, Movietone, Pram, Tarwater and Parlour.

== History ==
=== Formation and early lineups ===
Caroline Ross had played guitar or bass in various London bands during the 1990s, later teaming up with fine artist Jim Brook (who also played music under the name of Jim Version). The duo's first band was "Ripley", soon renamed "Vaughan." In 1998, after various line-up changes, the formation became Delicate AWOL, in which Ross (vocals, guitar, flute) and Version (guitar) were joined by Yann Faurie (drums) and Valerie Lockett from London (bass guitar). Ensconcing themselves in Toby Robinson's Moat Studios in Stockwell, the band began to work on refining their sound.

In 1999, Ross and Version set up the Day Release record label to release their own future recordings and those of others. Releases from Day Release included material by Robinson's Krautrock project The Nazgul, singer songwriter David Hurn, Godspeed You! Black Emperor spinoff Trois Pistoles, The Monsoon Bassoon, amongst others. One of the first Day Release releases, in mid-1999, was Delicate AWOL's debut EP Random Blinking Lights. At the time, the band was still very much in an art-rock/indie rock vein, sporting an abrasive edge, relatively simple rhythms, Version's heavily distorted guitar and Ross singing in an incantatory tone reminiscent of Patti Smith. The band also developed a short-lived all-instrumental alter ego called Forty Shades Of Black, releasing a simultaneous single called "Belisha". A tour of England and Scotland to promote both of the new releases ended with some changes to the line-up in Scotland with Faurie and Lockett leaving the group to work on other projects. Delicate AWOL completed their tour obligations playing the final gig of the tour at King Tut's in Glasgow as a two-piece of Ross and Version.

=== Stabilizing the line-up, and Our Genome ===
Heartened by the positive audience reception in Glasgow, Ross and Version returned to London and began recording their debut album, Our Genome, as a duo. When Michael Donnelly (bass) and Tom Page (drums) were recruited into the band mid-sessions. Ross and Version became so enthused with their new bandmates’ contributions that they scrapped the original version of Our Genome altogether and began rewriting and recording the album from scratch. Some tracks from the original Our Genome sessions surfaced later as EP tracks, and a few complete copies of the shelved album are in private hands.

In the summer of 2000, Delicate AWOL released the "Hurray for Sugar" single - a delicate, whispering song which clearly indicated that the band had moved on from their more abrasive beginnings. Tom Page's percussionist brother Ben Page was added to the line-up, and Ross added more instruments to her live armory (including ocarina, melodica and assorted small percussion instruments). The band's next release was part of the Day Release "Four Seasons Singles Club", a series of releases each of which featured three EPs from three different artists: Delicate AWOL contributed three tracks to the "Autumn" issue. In November 2000, the band performed at the fourth Terrastock festival in Seattle, Washington State, USA.

Our Genome was released by Day Release Records in the spring of 2001. It displayed a much-evolved band sound – more cohesive and dynamic, and considerably quieter, with added instrumentation (including horns) on several tracks. Demonstrating the band's intention to keep moving, it featured none of the early singles and no previously released tracks. The band were now heading in a post-rock direction, with Ross’ vocals assuming more of an ensemble/instrumental quality and various experiments with textures.

By this time, Delicate AWOL had also established themselves as a significant band within the London math rock scene, sharing stages and audiences with bands such as the Monsoon Bassoon, Rothko, the Shrubbies (featuring future North Sea Radio Orchestra members), Geiger Counter, Billy Mahonie and others. For a while, they also ran their own club night, "Everywhere Is Mouse", in the basement of Helter Skelter music bookstore in Denmark Street. The event attracted performers including The Monsoon Bassoon, Stewart Lee and Al Murray (performing as part of a band), Keith Burstein and others.

Adding trumpeter Jo Wright to the line-up, Delicate AWOL toured America during the summer of 2001 and returned to play the fifth Terrastock festival (this time in Boston) in October. The Driesh EP, released in autumn 2001 (with the band's elegiac set-closer "Dust" as the lead track) ended the band's middle period. One track - the instrumental "Evergreen China Prairie Tribunal" - pointed the way forward towards the next phase.

=== Heart Drops from the Great Space ===
As a live act, Delicate AWOL were becoming more and more influenced by the lighter and more fluid rhythms of jazz, with the rhythm section now embracing spacious groove and Latin-inspired rhythms, Wright improvising complex trumpet lines and Ben Page playing analogue-style synthesizers as well as percussion. Although Version's overdriven guitar maintained a link to the band's art rock past, Ross was now a committed multi-instrumentalist with a vocal style that had begun to incorporate folk, Latin and swing stylings.

In 2002, the band signed a deal with the revived indie label Fire Records and wound up Day Release Records in order to concentrate on band work (David Hurn also made the crossing from Day Release to Fire). The band's second album, Heart Drops From The Great Space was released on Fire Records the same year and was accompanied by the 12-inch vinyl EP Time And Motion Studies Deep Underground. Both clearly demonstrated the evolution of the live band, who also cemented their links with Rothko by providing most of the instrumentation on the 2004 Rothko album A Continual Search for Origins.

=== Relocation and split ===
In 2003, Delicate AWOL relocated from London to the village of Huntly (in Aberdeenshire, Scotland). This was apparently an attempt to escape urban pressures, to liberate their musical creativity (including Version's burgeoning career as a sound engineer and producer) and to get more involved in both community activity and the band's other love - visual art.

In fact, the move led to the slow disintegration of the band. While maintaining her links with Delicate AWOL, Jo Wright had already left the active lineup: she was shortly followed by bass player Donnelly. In 2005 the Page brothers also left the band and returned to London. Donelly was replaced for a while by the Aberdeen-based Philip Johnston (who also doubled on flute and saxophone).

A final version of Delicate AWOL performed at the Tunnels club in Aberdeen on April 10, 2005, with the line-up: Ross, Version, Neil Scollay (drums), Danny Ashton (guitar), Kate Mutsaers and Martha Buckingham (vocals). This line-up and guest Marian Nagahiro performed at Forgue Kirk in Huntly on 30 April 2005.

Ross and Version quietly dissolved Delicate AWOL shortly after their last performance, having found that their new compositions were unsuited to the restrictions of a settled band.

== Post-split activities ==
Ross and Version continued to work together for a few years as the avant-folk/experimental duo Tells before going their separate ways. Songs originally conceived for the third Delicate AWOL album appeared on Tells' lone 2006 album Hope Your Wounds Heal. While still with Tells, Caroline Ross contributed to two tracks on Susumu Yokota's 2005 album Distant Sounds of Summer as well as recording a collaboration album with Rothko called A Place Between which is credited to Rothko and Caroline Ross.

Jim Version - reverting to his original surname of Brooks - would subsequently relocate to Cheltenham, where he remained involved in art and music. Returning to London and the south-east, Ross joined the live band of experimental folk musician Woodpecker Wooliams in 2009, singing and playing flute, glockenspiel, omnichord, cheese-grater and other instruments and items.

Regarding the other former members of Delicate AWOL, Michael Donelly would return to London and continue as part of the second and third lineups of Rothko, while Tom and Ben Page would form the improvising instrumental duo Rocketnumbernine (working both solo and with artists such as Neneh Cherry). Under her married name of Downs, Jo Wright went on to work with The Sweet Believers and assorted jazz orchestras.

Former French drummer Yann Faurie played, toured and recorded with power pop band EL ROYCE for 10 years, and is now playing and composing in the duo Mechuta.

== Members ==
- Caroline Ross - vocals, guitar, bass guitar, percussion, melodica, ocarina (1998–2005)
- Jim Version - guitar (1998–2005)
- Yann Faurie - drums (1998–1999) UK & European Tours
- Valerie Lockett - bass guitar (1998–1999) UK & European Tours
- Michael Donnelly - bass guitar (2000–2004)
- Tom Page - drums (2000–2005)
- Ben Page - percussion, keyboards (2000–2005)
- Jo Wright - trumpet (2001–2003)
- Philip Johnston - bass guitar, flute, saxophone (2005)
- Neil Scollay - drums (2005)
- Danny Ashton - guitar (2005)
- Kate Mutsaers, Martha Buckingham - additional vocals (2005)
- Marian Nagahiro - additional vocals (2005)

Several other undocumented musicians played in the band during 1998–1999.

== Discography ==
=== Albums ===
- Our Genome (2001, Day Release Records)
- Heart Drops from the Great Space (2003, Fire Records)

=== Singles & EPs ===
- Random Blinking Lights (1999, Day Release Records)
- Hurray For Sugar (2000, Day Release Records)
- In a City of.... (I Saw Your Face First) / Busted Pony / Feelings Hardly Ever Mean a Thing (2000, Day Release Records – included in "Autumn" triple CD EP box-set release as part of Four Seasons Singles Club)
- Driesh (2001, Day Release Records)
- Time & Motion Studies Deep Underground (Fire Records, 2003)

=== As Forty Shades of Black ===
- Belisha – Single (1999, Day Release Records)

=== Miscellaneous ===
- Our Genome (2000 – original debut album with completely different content apart from one track - unreleased)
