= Symbol (number theory) =

In number theory, a symbol is any of many different generalizations of the Legendre symbol. This article describes the relations between these various generalizations.

The symbols below are arranged roughly in order of the date they were introduced, which is usually (but not always) in order of increasing generality.

- Legendre symbol $\left(\frac{a}{p}\right)$ defined for p a prime, a an integer, and takes values 0, 1, or −1.
- Jacobi symbol $\left(\frac{a}{b}\right)$ defined for b a positive odd integer, a an integer, and takes values 0, 1, or −1. An extension of the Legendre symbol to more general values of b.
- Kronecker symbol $\left(\frac{a}{b}\right)$ defined for b any integer, a an integer, and takes values 0, 1, or −1. An extension of the Jacobi and Legendre symbols to more general values of b.
- Power residue symbol $\left(\frac{a}{b}\right)=\left(\frac{a}{b}\right)_m$ is defined for a in some global field containing the mth roots of 1 ( for some m), b a fractional ideal of K built from prime ideals coprime to m. The symbol takes values in the m roots of 1. When m = 2 and the global field is the rationals this is more or less the same as the Jacobi symbol.
- Hilbert symbol The local Hilbert symbol (a,b) is defined for a and b in some local field containing the m roots of 1 (for some m) and takes values in the m roots of 1. The power residue symbol can be written in terms of the Hilbert symbol. The global Hilbert symbol $(a,b)_p=\left(\frac{a,b}{p}\right)=\left(\frac{a,b}{p}\right)_m$ is defined for a and b in some global field K, for p a finite or infinite place of K, and is equal to the local Hilbert symbol in the completion of K at the place p.
- Artin symbol The local Artin symbol or norm residue symbol $\theta_{L/K}(\alpha) = (\alpha,L/K) = \left(\frac{L/K}{\alpha}\right)$ is defined for L a finite extension of the local field K, α an element of K, and takes values in the abelianization of the Galois group Gal(L/K). The global Artin symbol $\psi_{L/K}(\alpha) = (\alpha,L/K) = \left(\frac{L/K}{\alpha}\right)=((L/K)/\alpha)$ is defined for α in a ray class group or idele (class) group of a global field K, and takes values in the abelianization of Gal(L/K) for L an abelian extension of K. When α is in the idele group the symbol is sometimes called a Chevalley symbol or Artin–Chevalley symbol. The local Hilbert symbol of K can be written in terms of the Artin symbol for Kummer extensions L/K, where the roots of unity can be identified with elements of the Galois group.
- The Frobenius symbol $[(L/K)/P]=\left[\frac{L/K}{P}\right]$ is the same as the Frobenius element of the prime P of the Galois extension L of K.
- "Chevalley symbol" has several slightly different meanings. It is sometimes used for the Artin symbol for ideles. A variation of this is the Chevalley symbol $\left(\frac{a,\chi}{p}\right)$ for p a prime ideal of K, a an element of K, and χ a homomorphism of the Galois group of K to R/Z. The value of the symbol is then the value of the character χ on the usual Artin symbol.
- Norm residue symbol This name is for several different closely related symbols, such as the Artin symbol or the Hilbert symbol or Hasse's norm residue symbol. The Hasse norm residue symbol $((\alpha,L/K)/p)=\left(\frac{\alpha,L/K}{p}\right)$ is defined if p is a place of K and α an element of K. It is essentially the same as the local Artin symbol for the localization of K at p. The Hilbert symbol is a special case of it in the case of Kummer extensions.
- Steinberg symbol (a,b). This is a generalization of the local Hilbert symbol to arbitrary fields F. The numbers a and b are elements of F, and the symbol (a,b) takes values in the second K-group of F.
- Galois symbol A sort of generalization of the Steinberg symbol to higher algebraic K-theory. It takes a Milnor K-group to an étale cohomology group.

== See also ==
- Contou-Carrère symbol
- Mennicke symbol
