= Local symbol =

In mathematics, local symbol may refer to:

- The local Artin symbol in Artin reciprocity
- The local symbol used to formulate Weil reciprocity
- A Steinberg symbol on a local field
