= Distant Sounds of Summer =

Studio album by Susumu Yokota & Rothko
- Released: October 25, 2005
- Genre: Ambient
- Length: 49:28
- Label: Lo Recordings
- Producer: Susumu Yokota, Mark Beazley

Susumu Yokota & Rothko chronology
Waters Edge EP (2002)	Distant Sounds of Summer (2005)

Professional ratings
Review scores
Source	Rating
AllMusic	3.5/5 stars
PopMatters	8/10 stars
Tiny Mix Tapes	4/5 stars
XLR8R	favorable

Distant Sounds of Summer is a collaborative studio album by Susumu Yokota & Rothko, released on Lo Recordings in 2005. It features vocal contributions from Caroline Ross. It peaked at number 37 on the UK Independent Albums Chart.

== Track listing ==
All lyrics are written by Caroline Ross; all music is composed by Susumu Yokota and Mark Beazley

No.	Title	Length
1.	"Deep in Mist"	4:33
2.	"Waters Edge"	4:30
3.	"Path Fades into Forest"	5:59
4.	"Lit by Moonlight"	5:40
5.	"Brook and Burn"	5:12
6.	"Sentiero"	5:17
7.	"Clear Space"	5:23
8.	"Reflections and Shadows"	5:00
9.	"Distant Sounds of Summer"	5:20
10.	"Floating Moon"	2:29

== Personnel ==
Credits adapted from liner notes.

- Susumu Yokota – music, production
- Mark Beazley – music, production
- Caroline Ross – lyrics, vocals
- Denis Blackham – mastering
- Richard Green – photography
- Non-Format – art direction, design

== Charts ==
Chart	Peak position
UK Independent Albums (OCC)	37
