= Yamamoto's reciprocity law =

Reciprocity law related to class numbers of quadratic number fields

In mathematics, Yamamoto's reciprocity law is a reciprocity law related to class numbers of quadratic number fields, introduced by Yamamoto (1986).
