= Ensemble (Ensemble album) =

Studio album by Ensemble
- Released: 19 September 2006
- Recorded: 2002–2005
- Genre: Electronic
- Length: 43:30
- Label: FatCat
- Producer: Olivier Alary

Ensemble chronology
Sketch Proposals (2000)	Ensemble (2006)	Excerpts (2011)

Ensemble is the second studio album by French musician Olivier Alary under the name Ensemble. It was released on 19 September 2006 through FatCat Records. It includes vocal contributions from Mileece, Lou Barlow, Cat Power's Chan Marshall, and Camille Claverie. The Disown, Delete EP was released prior to the album.

== Background ==
Olivier Alary and vocalist Chanelle Kimber released the debut studio album, Sketch Proposals, under the group name Ensemble in 2000 through Rephlex Records. Alary subsequently broke ties with Kimber, and Ensemble became his solo project. He collaborated with Björk on the song "Desired Constellation" for her album, Medúlla.

It took Alary four years to create Ensemble's self-titled, second studio album. The album includes vocal contributions from Mileece (on "Summerstorm" and "All We Leave Behind"), Lou Barlow (on "One Kind Two Minds"), Cat Power's Chan Marshall (on "Disown, Delete"), and Camille Claverie (on "Loose"). Johannes Malfatti provided orchestral arrangements throughout the album.

== Critical reception ==
Professional ratings
Review scores
Source	Rating
The A.V. Club	A−
Pitchfork	5.7/10
PopMatters	7/10
Stylus Magazine	B−

Doug Mosurock of CMJ New Music Monthly stated, "Alternating between warm and cool modes, Ensemble constructs long-form pop epics with the skill of dancers slowly unveiling a work of art in muted reds and deep, enveloping blues." Michael D. Ayers of Billboard praised Mileece's vocals, commenting that her "airy, whimsical voice comes off as the best fit for these stark arrangements." He added, "Ensemble's not for everyone, but if you're into Eno-inspired, stripped-down electronica, Alary might be your guy." David Hemingway of XLR8R stated, "Alary's reanimated Ensemble sounds perfectly poised, equidistant between electronic and acoustic, between melody and noise, between loveliness and abstraction." He described it as "an album that thrives on its various antithetical qualities."

== Track listing ==
Ensemble track listing
No.	Title	Writer(s)	Length
1.	"Summerstorm"	Olivier Alary; Mileece	6:59
2.	"Still"	Alary	2:04
3.	"One Kind Two Minds"	Alary; Lou Barlow	5:55
4.	"Unrest"	Alary	1:52
5.	"Disown, Delete"	Alary; Chan Marshall	6:13
6.	"All We Leave Behind"	Alary; Mileece	4:47
7.	"Loose"	Alary	9:36
8.	"For Good"	Alary	6:04
Total length:			43:30

== Personnel ==
Credits adapted from liner notes.

- Olivier Alary – electronics, guitar, bass guitar, piano, vocals, production, mixing, artwork concept
- Adam Pierce – drums
- Erik Hove – saxophone (1)
- Mileece – vocals (1, 6)
- Lou Barlow – vocals (3)
- Chan Marshall – vocals (5)
- Camille Claverie – vocals (7)
- Johannes Malfatti – orchestral arrangement, mixing
- Ryan Morey – mastering
- Marc Alary – artwork design, photography
