= Symbolism =

Symbolism or symbolist may refer to:

- Symbol, any object or sign that represents an idea

== Arts ==
- Artistic symbol, an element of a literary, visual, or other work of art that represents an idea
  - Color symbolism, the use of colors within various cultures and artworks to express a variety of symbolic meanings
- Symbolism (movement), a 19th-century artistic movement rejecting Realism
  - Symbolist movement in Romania, symbolist literature, and visual arts in Romania during the late 19th and early 20th centuries
  - Russian symbolism, the Russian branch of the symbolist movement in European art

== Religion ==
- Religious symbol, an iconic representation of a religion or religious concept
  - Buddhist symbolism, the use of Buddhist art to represent certain aspects of dharma
  - Christian symbolism, the use of symbols, including archetypes, acts, artwork, or events, by Christianity
  - Symbols of Islam, the use of symbols in Islamic literature, art, and architecture
  - Jewish symbolism, a visible religious token of the relation between God and man

== Science ==
- Symbolic anthropology, the study of cultural symbols and how those symbols can be interpreted to better understand a particular society
- Symbolic system, a system of interconnected symbolic meanings
- Solar symbol, a symbol that represents the sun in psychoanalysis, symbolism, semiotics, or other fields

== See also ==
- Symbolic representation (disambiguation)
- Symbolic (disambiguation)
- Symbology (disambiguation)
- Symbol (disambiguation)
- Realism (arts)
- Naturalism (arts)
- Representationalism
- simbolism misspelling
