= Social Market Foundation =

British think tank

Coordinates: 51.492314°N 0.125932°W

- Abbreviation: SMF
- Formation: 1989; 37 years ago
- Founder: Robert Skidelsky; Daniel Finkelstein
- Type: Think tank
- Registration no.: 1000971
- Legal status: Charity
- Purpose: "To advance the education of the public in the economic, social and political sciences"
- Headquarters: Millbank Tower
- Location: London, United Kingdom
- Fields: Cost of living, productivity, financial services, Public Sector Reform
- Official language: English
- Director: Theo Bertram
- Research Director: Dr Rebecca Montacute
- Affiliations: 'Continuing' SDP (1989–90); Conservative Party; Labour Party; Liberal Democrats
- Revenue: £826,860
- Expenses: £810,360
- Staff: 14
- Website: www.smf.co.uk

The Social Market Foundation (SMF) is an independent British political public policy think-tank based in Westminster, London. It is one of the 'Top 12 Think Tanks in Britain' and was named 'UK Think Tank of the Year' by Prospect in 2012. Its purpose is to "advance the education of the public in the economic, social and political sciences" and to "champion ideas that marry a pro-market orientation with concern for social justice". Policy ideas are based on the concept of the social market economy.

== History ==
Founded in 1989, the organisation was established by individuals close to David Owen's 'continuing' Social Democratic Party, which had itself been formed the year beforehand by those members of the original SDP who refused to accept that party's merger with the Liberals. Owen had made much use of the term 'social market' (when describing the economic model he espoused) as an alternative to Thatcherism, and upon the Foundation's establishment he was made one of its trustees. The Foundation's first executive director was the 'continuing' SDP peer Lord Kilmarnock, and its chairman from 1991 was Robert Skidelsky, Professor of Political Economy at Warwick University, who was responsible for much of the Owenite SDP's economic policy, having written a green paper on the social market economy for the party's first conference in September 1988.

Following the demise of the 'continuing' SDP in 1990, the Foundation gravitated to the post-Thatcher Conservative Party, and in press circles it was often cited as "John Major's favourite thinktank". Skidelsky himself joined the Conservatives in 1992, shortly after being made a life peer by the government, while two directors, Rick Nye and Daniel Finkelstein, both former SDP activists and political advisers to David Owen, later left the Foundation to work for the Conservative Research Department.

In the late 1990s the Foundation moved closer to New Labour, with Gordon Brown giving a speech about 'social markets' at the Foundation in 2003, and SMF publishing a paper by Gordon Brown in 2004. In 2001, Lord Skidelsky was replaced as chair by David, Lord Lipsey, who in the 1970s had been a special adviser to the Labour politician Anthony Crosland. The Foundation was thus associated with some of the policies of New Labour, particularly issues of public service reform.

In September 2010 Mary Ann Sieghart, the political and social affairs journalist, took over as chair.

== Policy goals ==
The SMF's remit is to focus on domestic public policy, particularly the public services and welfare. The majority of publications are therefore focused on issues concerning education, health care and employment. However it also produces publications on wide-ranging subjects such as road-pricing, casinos and energy policy.

The SMF has a 20-member Policy Advisory Board, which as of 2018 included the Members of Parliament (MPs) Stephen Kinnock, Norman Lamb, Chris Leslie, Alison McGovern, Tom Tugendhat, Chuka Umunna and John Woodcock.

== Funding ==
In November 2022, the funding transparency website Who Funds You? gave The Social Market Foundation a B grade (rating goes from A to E).

== See also ==
- List of think tanks in the United Kingdom
