= Symbolic representation =

Symbolic representation may refer to:

- Symbol, an object that represents, stands for, or suggests an idea, belief, action, or material entity
- Symbolism (disambiguation), various meanings in art, religion, and science
- Symbolic linguistic representation, a representation of an utterance that uses symbols to represent linguistic information

== See also ==
- Symbolic (disambiguation)
- Representation (disambiguation)
