= Grinning Cat =

Studio album by Susumu Yokota
- Released: June 4, 2001
- Genre: Ambient
- Length: 49:37
- Label: Skintone (JP) STR06 Leaf (UK) BAY17

Susumu Yokota chronology
| Zero Remixes (2001) | Grinning Cat (2001) | Will (2001) |

Professional ratings
Review scores
| Source | Rating |
|---|---|
| Allmusic | 4/5 stars |
| Pitchfork Media | (7.8/10) |

Grinning Cat is a full-length album from electronic artist Susumu Yokota, released in 2001.

== Track listing ==
1. "I Imagine" – 2:34
2. "King Dragonfly" – 4:42
3. "Card Nation" – 4:00
4. "Sleepy Eye" – 2:44
5. "Lapis Lazuli" – 3:49
6. "Balloon in the Cage" – 1:02
7. "Cherry Blossom" – 5:25
8. "Love Bird" – 3:49
9. "Fearful Dream" – 4:10
10. "Tears of a Poet" – 4:36
11. "So Red" – 3:23
12. "Flying Cat" – 5:52
13. "Lost Child" – 3:26

== Charts ==
Chart performance for Grinning Cat
| Chart (2025) | Peak position |
|---|---|
| UK Dance Albums (OCC) | 8 |
