= Zoon Van Snook =

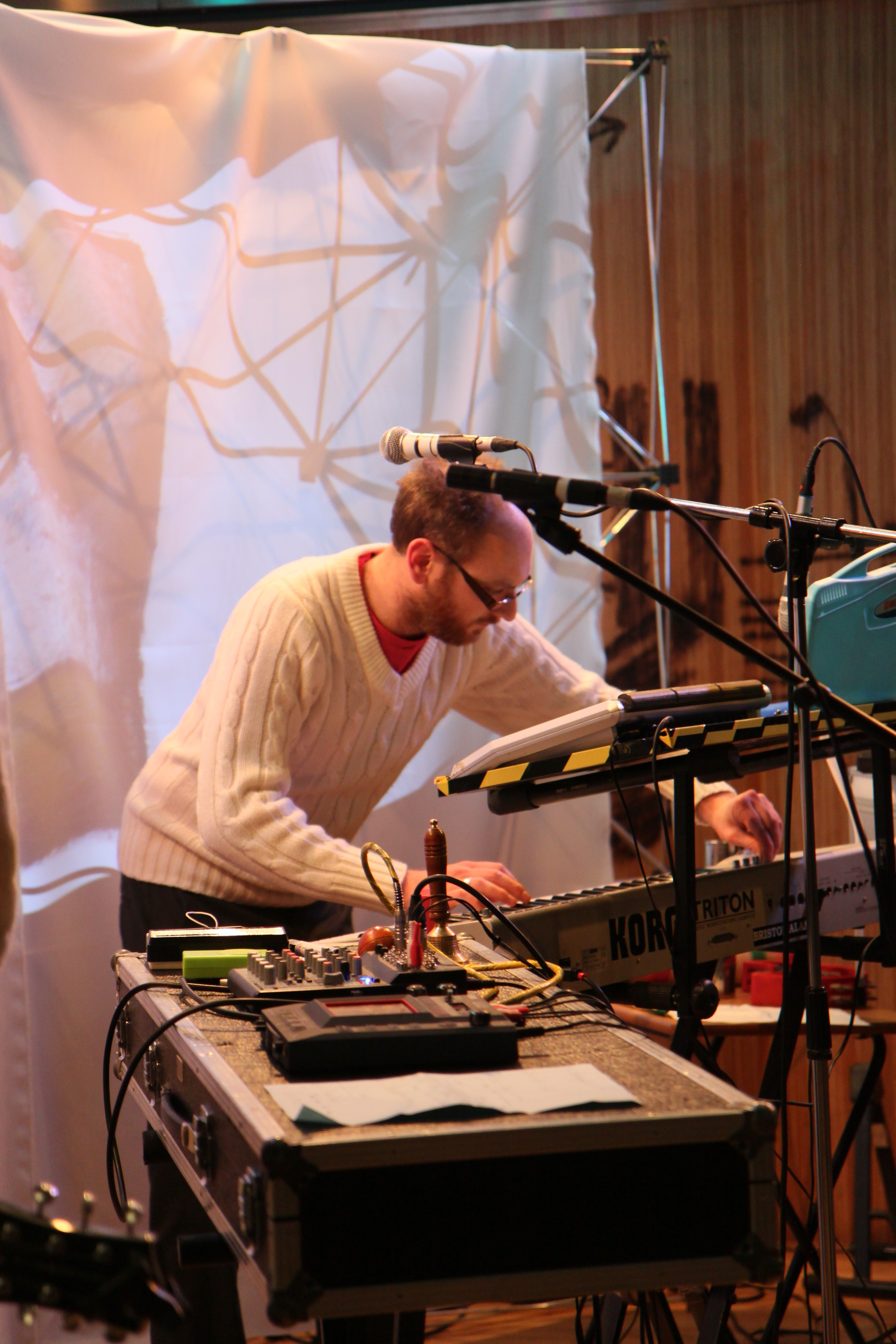
- Zoon Van Snook performing live at the Colston Hall, 2010.

Background information
- Born: Alec Snook; Tongeren, Belgium
- Origin: Bristol, England
- Genres: Electronica
- Occupations: Songwriter, record producer, remixer
- Instrument: Keyboards
- Years active: 2007–present
- Labels: Lo Recordings, Studio !K7, Mush Records, Cookshop Music, Alter-K
- Website: www.zoonvansnook.co.uk

Alec Snook, better known by his stage name Zoon Van Snook (often styled as Zoon van snooK, Dutch pronunciation: [ˈzoːɱ vɑn ˈsnoːk]), is a Bristolian composer, producer and remixer.

Using a combination of found sound, field recordings, electronics, keyboards and various acoustic instruments including harps, lyres, charangos, ukuleles and mbiras, Snook's music is often referred to as Oddtronica.

== Career ==
The debut 12" EP Interviews & Interludes (CKS014) was released on Brighton label Cookshop in September 2008. Lead track "Bibliophone" (created by recording the sound of various books slamming/pages flicking) was championed by the BBC's Rob Da Bank, Huw Stephens, and Stephen Merchant, and led to the first hour-long mix for Ninja Tune's Solid Steel Radio.

The debut album (Falling from) The Nutty Tree was released on Mush Records in 2010.

The CD booklet features an individually chosen piece of artwork for each song, created by US artist Seth Fitts. Each image has printed on it a poem, lyric, vignette or short, by various Bristolian writers and artists. UK stocks of the album were depleted after the fire at the Sony/PIAS warehouse in Enfield, during the 2011 England riots, which ironically took place on Snook's birthday.

In November 2012, ZvS signed to UK label Lo Recordings to release second album The Bridge Between Life & Death in June 2013, the recording of which took two years to complete. The album was built around 12 separate field recordings taken in Iceland at the end of 2009. The title is derived from a bridge in Kópavogur that the locals call so, because it has the nursing home on one side and the cemetery on the other. The individual songs and album as a whole are themed around this. The album features collaborations with Amiina, Sin Fang (Seabear) and Benni Hemm Hemm (Morr).

Radio support for the second album came in the form of BBC6 Music's Tom Robinson Introducing show and Stuart Maconie's Freak Zone.

Tracks from The Bridge Between Life & Death have been featured on the France 2 prime-time TV show Rendez-vous en Terre Inconnue (Episode 15, broadcast on 24 September 2013). The Ulrich Schnauss remix of second single The Gaits was also featured in the soundtrack to Carolina Herrera's spring 2014 collection at New York Fashion Week.

== Live ==
Different line-ups have existed for various live shows around the world. Initially a three-piece with bass, guitars, keys and electronics/FX, it was stripped down to a two-piece for a week-long tour of The Netherlands; Simple Things festival (with Jon Hopkins, Clark, Gonjasufi, Bibio, Jamie xx); and an exclusive live radio session for Tom Robinson's BBC6 Music show in the spring of 2011. Finally, the line-up was cut down to a solo show for two showcases at NXNE, Toronto in June 2011.

== DJ ==
Supports in the UK and Europe have included Daedelus, Gold Panda, and BBC Introducing showcases.

== Discography ==
=== Studio albums ===
- (Falling from) The Nutty Tree (2010, Mush Records)
- The Bridge Between Life & Death (2013, Lo Recordings)
- Se·pa·ra·ción (2020, Lo Recordings)

=== Remix albums ===
- (Remixes from) The Nutty Tree (2012, Mush Records)

=== EPs ===
- Interviews & Interludes (2008, Cookshop Music)
- Cuckoo (2010, Mush Records)
- The Verge of Winter (2013, Lo Recordings)

=== Singles ===
- "The Gaits (feat. Sin Fang)" (2013, Lo Recordings)

=== Compilations ===
- ICG 3rd Edition (2011, Inner City Grit)
- Seriously Eric #5 (2012, Alter-K)
- Seriously Eric #6 (2013, Alter-K)

=== Remixes ===
- Ernest Gonzales – "Run Jump Seek" (2008, Exponential Records)
- Fujiya & Miyagi – "Dishwasher" (2009, Full Time Hobby)
- Dextro – "The Pacifist" (2009, 16k Records)
- Ernest Gonzales – "Psychedelic Bellhop" (2010, Friends of Friends)
- Day of the Woman – "Cassette Tape" (2010, Exponential)
- Lost Idol – "Litewerk" (2010, Cookshop)
- Broadcast 2000 – "Rouse Your Bones" (2010, Grönland Records)
- Benni Hemm Hemm – "Vilhjalmur af Poitou" (2011, Kimi Records/Morr Music)
- Alka – "Immolated" (2011, Electronic Eel)
- The Doomed Bird of Providence – "Fedicia Exine" (2011, Front & Follow)
- Darwin Deez – "Up in the Clouds" (2011, Lucky Number Music)
- Justice & Metro – "839" (2012, Mjazz)
- Oddfellows Casino – "We Will Be Here" (2012, Nightjar Records)
- Malachai – "Anne" (2012, Double Six Records)
- Diagrams – "Antelope" (2012, Full Time Hobby)
- The Pictish Trail – "Of Course You Exist" (2012, Fence Records)
- James Yorkston – "Spanish Ants" (2013, Domino Recording Company/De-Fence)

=== Collaborations ===
- Cheek Mountain Thief – "Snook Pattern" from Cheek Mountain Thief (2012, Full Time Hobby)

=== Music videos ===
- "Ee'm Yorn" (2012) – Dir. Clive Summerill
- "The Verge of Winter" (2013) – Dir. Ívar Hollanders
- "The Gaits" (2013) – Dir. Sam Wisternoff
