= Mileece =

English sound artist and environmental designer

- Birth name: Mileece Abson
- Born: 1978 (age 46–47); London, England
- Occupations: Sound artist; environmental designer
- Years active: 2002–present
- Labels: Lo
- Spouse: Nathaniel Petre

Mileece Abson (born 1978), known mononymously as Mileece, is an English sound artist and environmental designer. She makes music with plants. She is the daughter of music video director Nick Abson.

== Early life ==
Mileece was born in 1978 in London, UK. Her father is Nick Abson. She spent her early life in England and California.

== Career ==
Mileece's debut studio album, Formations, was released in 2002 through Lo Recordings. Following that release, she toured with Múm, Mice Parade, and HIM. Her live show consisted of SuperCollider generative compositions with custom made instruments.

Mileece calls her sound art, aesthetic sonification, which is a way of relaying sound data into a representative mode that can be understood by all audiences.

In September 2015, at Sonos Studio LA, she exhibited a sound environment installation, called Sonic Garden, using plants and the Sonos Smart System. The installation was interactive and the audience were able to touch and interact with the plants.

She is featured in the documentary, Microfemininewarfare: Exploring Sound in Electronic Music (2016), alongside artists such as Mira Calix, Vaccine, Rucyl, and others.

== Discography ==
=== Studio albums ===
- Formations (Lo Recordings, 2002)

=== Contributions ===
- Ensemble – Ensemble ("Summerstorm" and "All We Leave Behind", FatCat Records, 2006)

=== Compilation album appearances ===
- Lo and Behold! Lo Quality Sampler ("Lullabye", Lo Recordings, 2002)
- Sacred Symbols of Mu ("Tau", Planet Mu, 2006)
