= Image 1983–1998 =

Compilation album by Susumu Yokota
- Released: 1998
- Recorded: 1983–1998
- Genre: Electronica, ambient
- Length: 34:29
- Label: Skintone (STR 02); Leaf (BAY 9 / BAY 9 V)
- Producer: Susumu Yokota

Susumu Yokota chronology
1998 (1998)	Image 1983–1998 (1998)	1999 (1999)

Professional ratings
Review scores
Source	Rating
Allmusic	4/5 stars

Image: 1983–1998 is a compilation of electronic music by Japanese artist Susumu Yokota. It was released in 1998 on Skintone in Japan, and on September 13, 1999 by The Leaf Label in the United Kingdom.

The album includes tracks created between 1983 and 1998 and originally on Yokota's own Skintone label. The album runs semi-chronologically, the first five tracks being from the years 1983 and 1984, whilst the remainder consists of tracks made in 1997 and 1998. The CD version also includes a fold-out of visual art created by Yokota in 1987 and 1988.

In the United Kingdom, the album was released both on CD and on vinyl. Tracks one to seven are included on side A, while the other six tracks are on side B.

"Nisemono no Uta" samples "Salad Days" by Young Marble Giants.

== Track listing ==
All tracks are written by Susumu Yokota.

No.	Title	Recorded	Length
1.	"Kaiten Mokuba"	1983	1:58
2.	"Tayutafu"	1983	2:42
3.	"Fukuro no Yume"	1984	2:44
4.	"Wani Natte"	1984	2:42
5.	"Sakashima"	1983	3:11
6.	"Morino Gakudan"	1997	3:28
7.	"Nisemono no Uta"	1998	2:00
8.	"Daremoshiranai Chiisanakuni"	1997	2:25
9.	"Kawano Hotorino Kinoshitade"	1998	2:30
10.	"Yumekui Kobito"	1998	1:34
11.	"Amai Niyoi"	1997	2:55
12.	"Enogu"	1998	3:03
13.	"Amanogawa"	1997	3:12
