= The Chap (band) =

English experimental pop band

- Origin: London, England
- Genres: Pop, indietronica
- Years active: 2000–present
- Labels: Lo Recordings; Ghostly International
- Members: Keith Duncan; Panos Ghikas; Claire Hope; Berit Immig; Johannes von Weizsäcker
- Website: www.thechap.org

The Chap are an English experimental pop band from North London. Their music is a mix of electronica, rock, Krautrock and pop.

== History ==
In early 2006, they toured Europe to support their second album Ham which gained much critical acclaim including an album of the month notice in The Wire. On 19 April 2008 (26 April in the UK), they released a third album, Mega Breakfast. During 2008 and 2009, the band completed several UK and mainland European tours as well as their first US tour.

In May 2010, they released Well Done Europe, which received a rating of 7.7 from Pitchfork Media and in March 2012, they released We Are Nobody, which received a rating of 7.0.

== Fun and interesting facts ==
The Chap's motto is: "Total administration corresponds to that historical moment when technical rationalization and instrumentality, in the service of capital, spreads beyond subject-external social and political relations to penetrate and determine, at a fundamental level, individual psycho-interiority."

== Band members ==
- Keith Duncan – drums, vocals, keyboards
- Panos Ghikas – bass, vocals, guitar, violin, computer, keyboards
- Claire Hope – keyboards, vocals, melodica
- Berit Immig – keyboards, vocals (also plays in band Omo)
- Johannes von Weizsäcker – guitar, vocals, cello, computer, keyboards

Berit Immig and Johannes von Weizsäcker first met when playing in the band Karamasov (Satellite Records).

== Discography ==
- 2003: The Horse (Lo Recordings)
- 2005: Ham (Lo Recordings)
- 2008: Mega Breakfast (Ghostly International/Lo Recordings)
- 2008: Builder's Brew Mini-album (Lo Recordings)
- 2010: Well Done Europe (Lo Recordings)
- 2011: We Are the Best (Lo Recordings)
- 2012: We Are Nobody (Lo Recordings)
- 2015: The Show Must Go (Lo Recordings)
- 2020: Digital Technology (Lo Recordings)
- 2023: Burger Sauce (Lo Recordings)
