= Astronauts (band) =

Solo musical project of Dan Carney

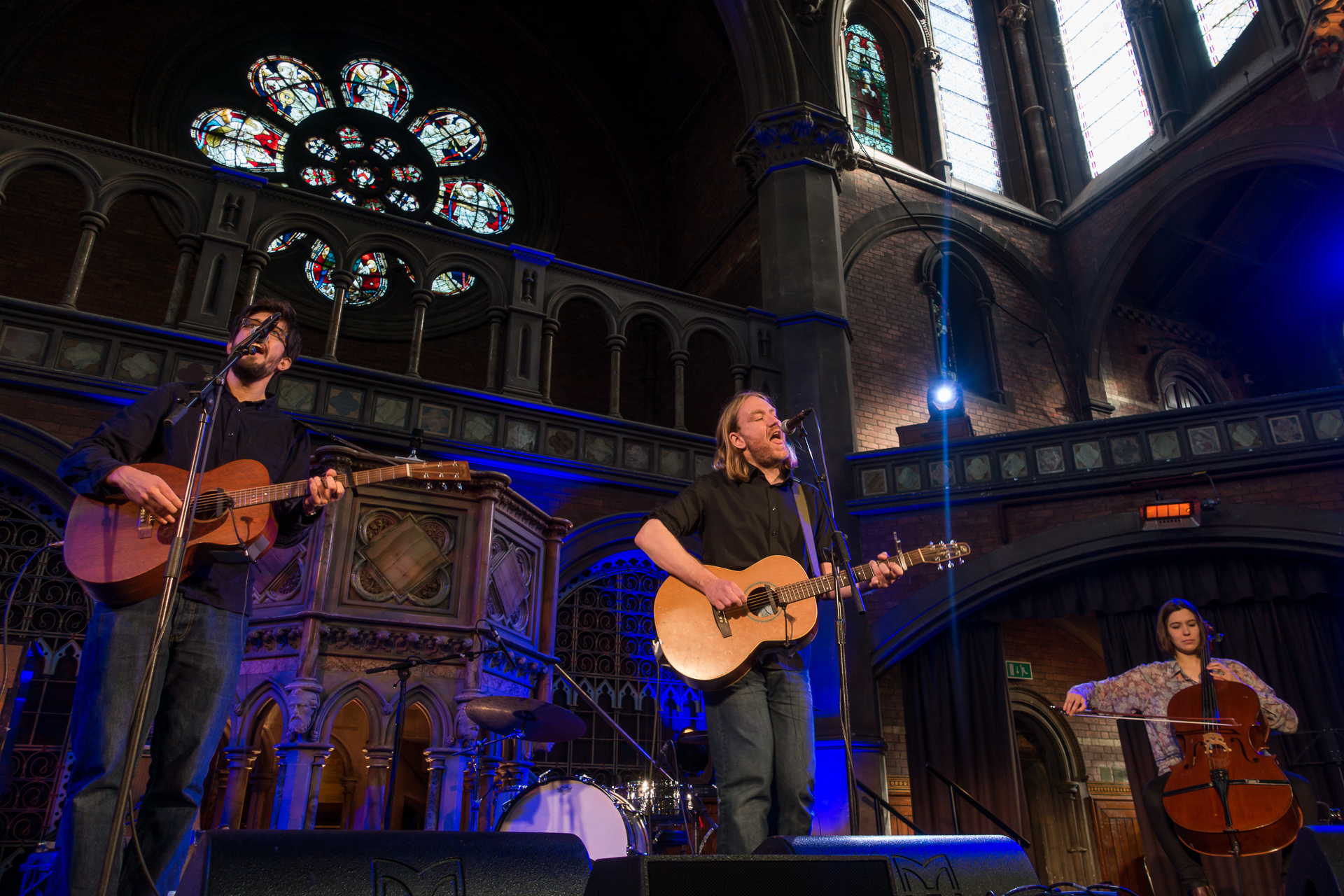

Background information
- Origin: London, England
- Genres: Indie, folk, alternative, rock
- Years active: 2013–present
- Label: Lo Recordings
- Website: https://soundcloud.com/astronauts-new-songs

Astronauts is the solo musical project of the UK songwriter Dan Carney. He is signed to London-based imprint Lo Recordings.

== History ==
Carney initially conceived the project in 2013, following the end of his previous band Dark Captain, and while recuperating from a badly broken leg. After the first Astronauts songs were uploaded to SoundCloud in November 2013, a deal was signed with Lo Recordings.

The debut Astronauts single, "Skydive", was released in June 2014, receiving support from BBC Radio 6 Music's Tom Ravenscroft, Gideon Coe, Cerys Matthews, and Steve Lamacq, as well as BBC Radio Scotland's Roddy Hart, and Huey Morgan on BBC Radio 2, earning Carney comparisons with Elliott Smith, Broken Bells, and The Shins, and making the Hype Machine charts. The video for the song was devised and directed by London-based Irish artist Michelle Deignan.

The debut album, Hollow Ponds, named after an area of Epping Forest near where Carney lives, and was hospitalised following his leg fracture, was released in July 2014. The collection featured musical contributions from Firestations' Michael Cranny (who co-authored a number of tracks), London alt-folk singer Jess Bryant and cellist Nicole Robson (Bat For Lashes, Stats), with Sputnik Music describing the sound as "often bleak and highly contemplative indie-folk".

The second album 'End Codes' was released in May 2016.

== Miscellaneous ==
Carney appears on There Are No Goodbyes, the 2009 album from Robin Proper-Sheppard's Sophia, playing guitar and providing vocal harmonies on the song "Storm Clouds". The album was released by the City Slang label.

He also has a PhD in developmental psychology, and has authored a number of research papers examining cognitive processing and memory in a number of developmental disorders. Using developmental trajectories to examine verbal and visuospatial short-term memory development in children and adolescents with Williams and Down syndromes, and executive function in Williams and Down syndromes.

== Discography ==
=== Singles ===
- "Skydive" (2014, Lo Recordings)
- "In My Direction" (2015, Lo Recordings)
- "Civil Engineer" (2016, Lo Recordings)
- "You Can Turn It Off" (2016, Lo Recordings)
- "Breakout" (2016, Lo Recordings)

=== EPs ===
- "Four Songs" (2014, Lo Recordings)

=== Albums ===
- Hollow Ponds (2014, Lo Recordings)
- End Codes (2016, Lo Recordings)
