= Symbology (disambiguation) =

Symbology concerns the study of symbols.

Symbology may also refer to:

- Semiotics, study of signs and symbols
- Barcode symbology, a term used to denote a type of barcode mapping representation.
- Symbol (programming)
- Symbolic anthropology, diverse set of approaches within cultural anthropology that view culture as a symbolic system that arises primarily from human interpretations of the world
- Symbolic system, used in the field of anthropology, sociology, and psychology to refer to a system of interconnected symbolic meanings
- Symbolism (disambiguation), use of symbols to represent ideas and emotions
- Iconography, branch of art history which studies images
- Military symbology, APP-6A, Military Symbols for Land Based Systems, NATO standardization agreement
