= Johannes Malfatti =

- Born: 1976 (age 48–49); Germany
- Genres: Ambient music, post classical, film music, chamber pop, drone music, vaporwave
- Occupations: Composer, producer, musician
- Instruments: Piano, drums, guitar, accordion
- Years active: 2001s–present
- Labels: FatCat Records, 130701, Glacial Movements, Seikomart
- Website: www.johannesmalfatti.com

Johannes Malfatti (born 1976) is a German composer, sound designer and multi-instrumentalist from Berlin. He releases music under his own name and various monikers and writes music for film, theatre, art installations and advertisement. He studied sound design at the Konrad Wolf Film University of Babelsberg and graduated with a degree in sound design for audio-visual media.

== Career ==
In 2003 he joined Olivier Alary and his project Ensemble, first as orchestral arranger and sound mixer for Ensemble's second studio album. His arrangements were recorded with the Deutsches Filmorchester Babelsberg. Malfatti also wrote the orchestral arrangements for Ensemble's remix of Björk's "Mouth's Cradle".

He co-wrote and produced Ensemble's third studio album Excerpts that was released in 2011 on FatCat Records.

Malfatti released his first solo album, Surge, on the Italian ambient label Glacial Movements in 2017. His follow up album 달빛백조의노래 Moonlight Swan Songs was released under the moniker 요유시 yoyush on Japanese vaporwave label Seikomart. and was available as limited cassette edition.

With u, i Malfatti and Alary released the first joined album under their own names in 2020. The album was produced using Voice over IP technology such as Skype or FaceTime. By sending audio material back and forth between their studios and by manipulating the network bandwidth they obtained various degrees of sonic artefacts that make up the sonic layout of the album. It is an exploration of contemporary mediated communication and is "an odyssey into the fragile, global communicative state, fusing found sound, drone and chamber instrumentation." (Backseat Mafia).

His work also includes music for theatre, dance productions and art installations notably with Emanuele Soavi, Laurie Young, Grayson Millwood, Gerhard Falkner, Jim Rakete, Candice Breitz, Arno Coenen and Benny Nemer.

== Discography ==
=== Albums ===
- 2003 - Alles will los 2 (as Dånzen jetzt) (Klangkrieg)
- 2004 - Unyoga (as Chlorgeschlecht) (Deco) (Honorary Mention at Ars Electronica 2004)
- 2006 - Ensemble (as Ensemble) (FatCat Records)
- 2011 - Excerpts (as Ensemble) (FatCat Records)
- 2017 - surge (as Johannes Malfatti) (Glacial Movements)
- 2018 - 달빛백조의노래 Moonlight Swan Songs (as 요유시 yoyush) (Seikomart)
- 2020 - u, i (as Johannes Malfatti, with Olivier Alary) (130701)
- 2020 - A splendid ornament (as Johannes Malfatti)

=== Eps ===
- 2002 - Transformer Hits (as Transformer di Roboter) (WMF Records)
- 2003 - Metal Kings (as Transformer di Roboter) (Deco)

=== Singles ===
- 2020 - I can´t even see myself
- 2020 - Drifting
- 2021 - Cloud Sketches I
- 2021 - Cloud Sketches II

=== Contributions ===
- 2002 - μ allstars criminal '02 (as Transformer di Roboter, compilation on Planet Mu)
- 2005 - Mouth's Cradle - Remix (with Ensemble)

== Selected film soundtracks ==
- 2007 - Up the Yangtze
- 2007 - Roots Germania
- 2009 - The Coca Cola Case
- 2011 - The Phantom Father
- 2011 - The Frog Princes
- 2011 - My Prince, My King (Mein Prinz, mein König)
- 2012 - The Fruit Hunters
- 2012 - China Heavyweight
- 2013 - Millionen
- 2015 - Ville-Marie
- 2015 - Glutnester
- 2018 - The Great Darkened Days
- 2018 - Colossus
- 2020 - Softie
- 2021 - Twist à Bamako
- 2022 - Midwives
- 2023 - Twice Colonized
- 2023 - Frontiers (Frontières)

== Awards ==
- 2013 - Gopo Awards Best Music nominee for The Phantom Father
- 2014 - Red Dot Grand Prix for the sound of Fascinating Gases
- 2023 - Prix Iris for Best Original Music in a Documentary nominee for Twice Colonized
