= Symbolic =

Symbolic may refer to:

- Symbol, something that represents an idea, a process, or a physical entity

== Mathematics, logic, and computing ==
- Symbolic computation, a scientific area concerned with computing with mathematical formulas
- Symbolic dynamics, a method for modeling dynamical systems by a discrete space consisting of infinite sequences of abstract symbols
- Symbolic execution, the analysis of computer programs by tracking symbolic rather than actual values
- Symbolic link, a special type of file in a computer memory storage system
- Symbolic logic, the use of symbols for logical operations in logic and mathematics

== Music ==
- Symbolic (Death album), a 1995 album by the band Death
- Symbolic (Voodoo Glow Skulls album), a 2000 album by the band Voodoo Glow Skulls

== Social sciences ==
- Symbolic anthropology, the study of cultural symbols and how those symbols can be interpreted to better understand a particular society
- Symbolic capital, the resources available to an individual on the basis of honor, prestige or recognition in sociology and anthropology
- Symbolic interaction, a system of interaction in sociology
- Symbolic system, a structured system of symbols in anthropology, sociology and psychology
- The Symbolic or Symbolic Order, Jacques Lacan's attempt to contrast with The Imaginary and The Real in psychoanalysis

== See also ==
- Symbol (disambiguation)
- Symbolism (disambiguation)
- Symbolic representation (disambiguation)
