= Symbol (album) =

Studio album by Susumu Yokota
- Released: October 27, 2004
- Genre: Electronic
- Length: 45:26
- Label: Skintone; Lo

Susumu Yokota chronology
Baroque (2004)	Symbol (2004)	Wonder Waltz (2006)

Professional ratings
Review scores
Source	Rating
AllMusic	4.5/5 stars
Pitchfork	(7.7/10)
PopMatters	(6/10)
Stylus Magazine	(A−)

Symbol is a studio album by Japanese electronica artist Susumu Yokota, released in 2004. This album is distinctive from others in his discography by being primarily composed of samples from classical orchestral pieces, such as Tchaikovsky's Nutcracker Suite and Saint-Saëns's Carnival of the Animals, as well as more modern compositions by John Cage and Meredith Monk. The cover art is a detail from the 1896 painting Hylas and the Nymphs by John William Waterhouse.

== Track listing ==
No.	Title	Writer(s)	Length
1.	"Long Long Silk Bridge"	Cage, Yokota	3:00
2.	"Purple Rose Minuet"	Cage, Yokota	3:34
3.	"Traveler in the Wonderland"	Yokota	4:20
4.	"Song of the Sleeping Forest"	Monk, Yokota	4:16
5.	"The Plateau Which the Zephyr of Flora Occupies"	Yokota	2:25
6.	"Fairy Dance of Twinkle and Shadow"	Yokota	4:17
7.	"Flaming Love and Destiny"	Monk, Yokota	4:54
8.	"The Dying Black Swan"	Monk, Yokota	2:21
9.	"Blue Sky and Yellow Sunflower"	Yokota	3:56
10.	"Capriccio and the Innovative Composer"	Yokota	2:23
11.	"I Close the Door Upon Myself"	Addinsell, Yokota	2:24
12.	"Symbol of Life, Love, and Aesthetics"	Yokota	3:53
13.	"Music from the Lake Surface"	Cage, Yokota	3:12
