= Rothko (band) =

English ambient music group

Rothko are an English, London-based mainly instrumental ambient group. The group mainly use bass guitars and keyboards to create their soundscapes. They derived their name from the painter Mark Rothko. They have been described by some as post-rock for their use of rock instrument the bass guitar to create what, according to others, is non-rock music.

== History ==
Formed in 1997, the original line-up consisted of Mark Beazley, Crawford Blair, and Jon Meade all playing bass guitar in a variety of different ways. This line-up released three albums on Lo Recordings and a host of singles and EPs on labels such as Bella Union, Bip Hop, Narwhal, and Livid Meerkat (Fierce Panda subsidiary) amongst others, before Beazley disbanded it in 2001.

Between 2001 and 2004, Beazley continued to perform and release music under the Rothko name either solo or with a variety of different line-ups, including ones which featured Francis Morgan and Michael Donnelly, Beazley and Donnelly together, and the line-up of London/Aberdeenshire experimental rock band Delicate AWOL. Since 2004, the group stabilised as Beazley (bass guitar), Michael Donnelly (bass guitar), Ben Page (keyboards) and Tom Page (drums and percussion) – the latter three all being ex-members of Delicate AWOL.

This line up of this history of the group disbanded in October 2010, with their last and final release being the "Sunset to Sunrise" EP, on Mark Beazley's own Trace Recordings label. Since disbanding, Tom and Ben Page went on to work as Rocketnumbernine, with their debut 12" release, "Matthew And Toby", produced and released by Kieran Hebden (Four Tet) on his own Text imprint and to back Neneh Cherry as both her recording and touring band. Michael Donnelly is also recording and releasing music under his own name.

The first new Rothko release since 2010, the "Severed Tense" EP, was released on Trace Recordings on 1 July 2015 and features a set of 4 brand new recordings, the group now consisting again of Mark Beazley and Michael Donnelly. A new album is scheduled for a late 2015 release.

As Rothko, Beazley also collaborated with artists such as Susumu Yokota, Caroline Ross of Delicate AWOL and JS Adams, aka BLK w/BEAR. He has also collaborated with Graham Dowdall, aka Gagarin, under the name Low Bias and also provided some of the original music score for the Discovery Channel documentary "The Flight That Fought Back", about United Airlines Flight 93.

Rothko now consist of Mark and long time group member, Michael Donnelly.

Mark also plays in Low Bias, with Graham Dowdall, aka Gagarin, and has recently collaborated with Anne Garner and James Murray under the name Tetherdown, and as Rome Pays Off, with original Rothko member, Crawford Blair.

== Discography ==
- A Negative For Francis (1999, Lo Recordings)
- Forty Years To Find A Voice (2000, Lo Recordings)
- In The Pulse of an Artery (2001, Bella Union)
- No Anchor No Chart No Rudder No Sails (2001, Burning Shed)
- Not Gone Not Forgotten (Live) (2001, Lo Recordings)
- A Continual Search For Origins (2002, Too Pure)
- Rothko & BLK w/BEAR – Wish for a World Without Hurt (2003, Trace Recordings)
- Rothko & Susumu Yokota – Distant Sounds of Summer (2005, Lo Recordings)
- Rothko & Caroline Ross – A Place Between (2005, Lo Recordings)
- Eleven Stages of Intervention (2007, Bip Hop)
- A Life Lived Elsewhere (2007, Trace Recordings)
- 1997 And Other Things (2009, Trace Recordings)
- Discover The Lost (2015, Trace Recordings)
- A Young Fist Curled Around A Cinder for a Wager (2016, Trace Recordings)
- Sunset to Sunrise (2016)
- If You Don't Leave We Will Kill You (2018)
- We Will Come Back to Haunt You (2018)
- Blood Demands More Blood (2018)
- No Anchor, No Chart, No Rudder, No Sails (2019)
- Burns in Film (2019)
- Refuge for Abandoned Souls (2019)
- Bury My Heart In The Mountains (2023, Jukebox Heart)
