= Steinberg symbol =

In mathematics a Steinberg symbol is a pairing function which generalises the Hilbert symbol and plays a role in the algebraic K-theory of fields. It is named after mathematician Robert Steinberg.

For a field $F$ we define a Steinberg symbol (or simply a symbol) to be a function $( \cdot , \cdot ) : F^* \times F^* \rightarrow G$, where $G$ is an abelian group, written multiplicatively, such that for all $a, b, c \in F^*$,

- $( ab, c) = (a, c)(b, c)$ and $( a, bc) = (a, b)(a, c)$, and
- if $a+b = 1$ then $(a,b) = 1$.

The first condition is sometimes referred to as $( \cdot , \cdot )$ being bimultiplicative, while the second condition is known as the Steinberg property.

The symbols on $F$ derive from a "universal" symbol, which may be regarded as taking values in $F^* \otimes F^* / \langle a \otimes 1-a \rangle$. By a theorem of Hideya Matsumoto, this group is $K_2 F$ and is part of the Milnor K-theory for a field.

== Properties ==
If $(\cdot ,\cdot)$ is a symbol on $F$, then for all $a, b \in F^*$ we have

- $(a, -a) = 1$;
- $(b, a) = (a, b)^{-1}$;
- $(a, a) = (a, -1)$ is an element of order 1 or 2;
- $(a, b) = (a+b, -b/a)$.

== Examples ==
- The trivial symbol which is identically 1.
- The Hilbert symbol on $F$ with values in {±1} defined by

$$(a,b)=\begin{cases}1,&\mbox{ if }z^2=ax^2+by^2\mbox{ has a non-zero solution }(x,y,z)\in F^3;\\-1,&\mbox{ if  not.}\end{cases}$$

- The Contou-Carrère symbol is a symbol for the ring of Laurent power series over an Artinian ring.

== Continuous symbols ==
If $F$ is a topological field then a symbol c is weakly continuous if for each y in F^{∗} the set of x in F^{∗} such that c(x,y) = 1 is closed in F^{∗}. This makes no reference to a topology on the codomain G. If G is a topological group, then one may speak of a continuous symbol, and when G is Hausdorff then a continuous symbol is weakly continuous.

The only weakly continuous symbols on R are the trivial symbol and the Hilbert symbol; the only weakly continuous symbol on C is the trivial symbol. The characterisation of weakly continuous symbols on a non-Archimedean local field F was obtained by Moore. The group K_{2}(F) is the direct sum of a cyclic group of order m and a divisible group K_{2}(F)^{m}. A symbol on F lifts to a homomorphism on K_{2}(F) and is weakly continuous precisely when it annihilates the divisible component K_{2}(F)^{m}. It follows that every weakly continuous symbol factors through the norm residue symbol.

== See also ==
- Steinberg group (K-theory)
