= Acid Mt. Fuji =

Studio album by Susumu Yokota
- Released: 1994
- Recorded: 1993–1994
- Studio: Heart Beat Studio
- Genres: Ambient techno; acid; experimental; minimal; industrial; psychedelia
- Length: 1:14:01
- Labels: Sublime Records; Midgar
- Producers: Susumu Yokota; Katsuo Michishita

Susumu Yokota chronology
| The Frankfurt-Tokyo Connection (1993) | Acid Mt. Fuji (1994) | Cat, Mouse And Me (1996) |

Professional ratings
Review scores
| Source | Rating |
|---|---|
| Resident Advisor | 4.5/5 marks |

Acid Mt. Fuji is the second studio album by Japanese electronic producer Susumu Yokota, and the first using his full birth name. Originally released in 1994 on the Japanese label Sublime Records and later remastered and reissued in 2018 on Midgar. It is notable as being one of his first records to engage with techno music, as well as its psychedelic and atmospheric sound.

== Background and composition ==
Acid Mt. Fuji was Yokota's first record to demonstrate his capability as a techno music producer. As well as this, the record makes use of oscillating manipulated sounds like forest field recordings and electronic percussion, especially drum machines that serve as backing, which prominently appear as echoes. The sample at the beginning of track 11, "Tanuki", is supposedly the voice of American neuroscientist and psychonaut John C. Lilly. The record ends with a field recording of the ocean, apparently one by Mount Fuji itself.

The literal translation of the Japanese title on the cover, 'Red Fuji', references Edo period artist Hokusai's wood block print "Fine Wind, Clear Morning"; the artwork is a manipulated version of it.

In Resident Advisor's review of Acid Mt. Fuji, they noted its references to Japanese supernatural folklore, such as yōkai, as well as Shinto shrines, in the record's track titles; they also describe "Kinoko" and "Meijijingu" as the 'moment[s] where 'Acid Mt. Fuji's psychoactive properties kick in and the real trip begins'. Jon Williams of experimental group Excepter, guest-writing for the music blog Listen to This, compared the record's sound to Robert Hood and Popol Vuh.

== Track listing ==
All tracks are written by and produced by Susumu Yokota.

| No. | Title | Length |
|---|---|---|
| 1. | "Zenmai" | 4:08 |
| 2. | "Kinoko" | 7:39 |
| 3. | "Meijijingu" | 6:50 |
| 4. | "Saboten" | 6:06 |
| 5. | "Oh My God" | 6:42 |
| 6. | "Tamberin" | 8:19 |
| 7. | "Oponchi" | 4:25 |
| 8. | "Ao-oni" | 6:17 |
| 9. | "Akafuji" | 7:24 |
| 10. | "Alphaville" | 8:56 |
| 11. | "Tanuki" | 8:48 |
| Total length: | | 1:14:01 |

== Personnel ==
- A&R – Masato Tani
- Co-producer – Nobolu Kaneko
- Design – Katsuhiko Kimura
- Executive producer – Katsuo Michishita
- All tracks created by – Susumu Yokota
- Label – Manabu Yamazaki
- Total sound – Susumu Yokota
