= Symbol (choir) =

Romanian choir

The Symbol is a choir in Romania that links to the great choir of the patriarchy of the Romanian Orthodox Church. Its headquarters are in the basement or the patriarchal palace in the choir room named after the mentor of the choir Nicolae Lungu.

== Founder and Conductors ==
The one who founded the choir is also the current conductor, Mr. Jean Lupu, currently 69 years old.

Excerpt from the 15-year album of the choir:

"Professor Jean Lupu, the founder and also the choir conductor, is a graduate of the Orthodox Theological Seminary in Craiova, the 'Radu Greceanu' High-school in Slatina and later, the National Academy of Music in Timișoara and Bucharest."

The one who is responsible for the funds distribution and management is Mrs. Doinița Neamțu. The president of the directorial council is Mrs. Aureliana Grama.

The assistant conductor is Luminița Gutanu, Doctor in Music, graduate of the National Music Institute in Kishinev, Republic of Moldova.

== Repertory ==
The repertory comprises more than 250 compositions, 25% being the work of the choir's mentor.
