= Aldeburgh Cinema =

Cinema and theatre in Aldeburgh, England

Coordinates: 52.1541°N 1.6017°E

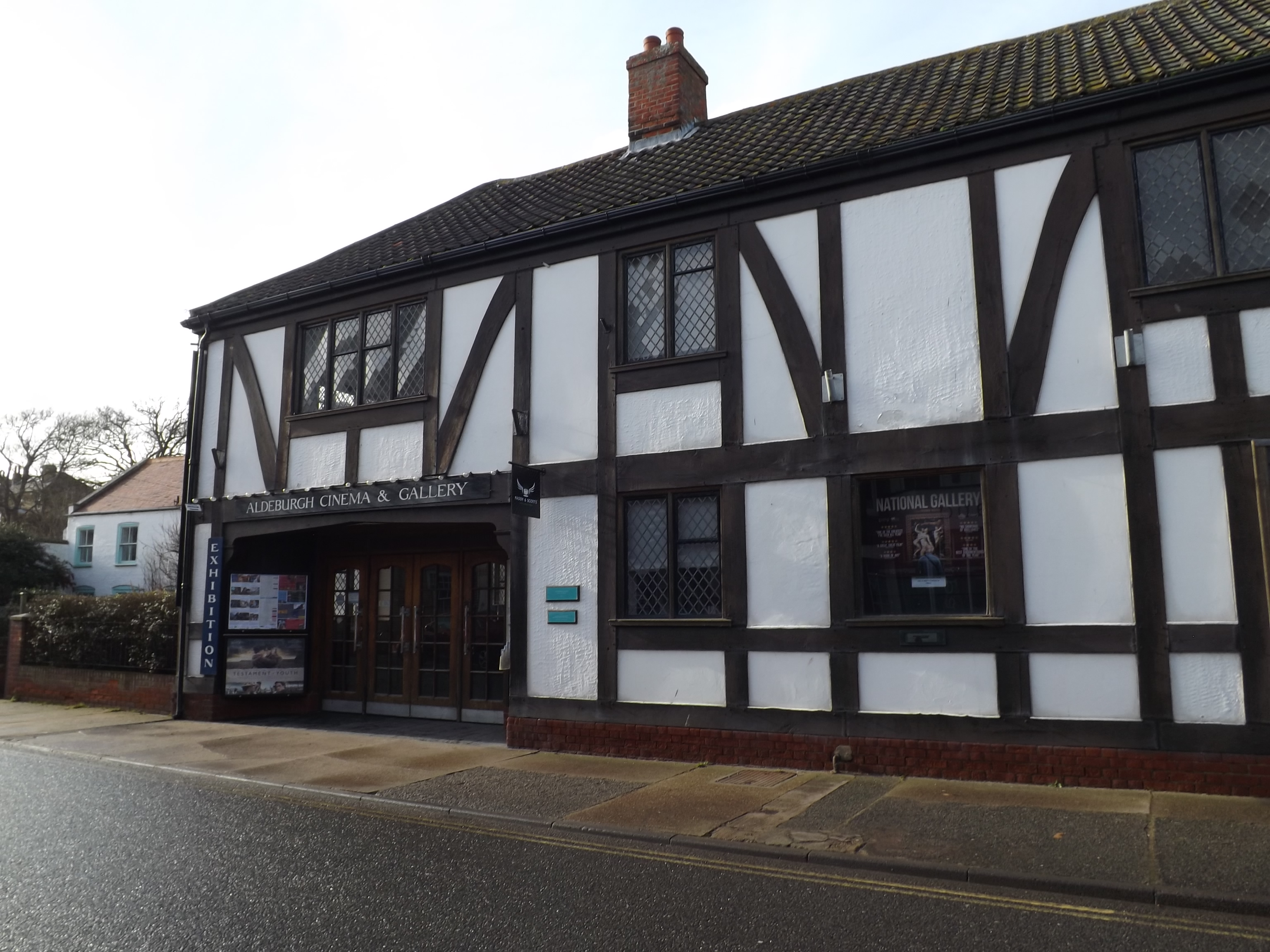
Aldeburgh Cinema

Aldeburgh Cinema is one of the oldest, continuously running cinema houses in the United Kingdom. It is located in the town of Aldeburgh, Suffolk. It has hosted many cinematic and performing arts events, including live theatre, operas, art exhibitions and ballet transmissions from the National Theatre, New York's Metropolitan Opera, the Royal Opera House, the National Gallery, the British Museum and Moscow's Bolshoi Ballet. Aldeburgh Cinema is the permanent home of the Aldeburgh Documentary Festival, run annually in November.

== History ==
Aldeburgh Cinema was founded in 1919 and has screened films regularly since then. The auditorium was built onto the back of a 19th-century High Street store.

In the 1960s the theatre was in financial difficulties and was scheduled to close; members of the community came together to refurbish the building and to organize events in the theatre. Among these was Susan Harrison, who in 2012 was presented with a British Empire Medal for her work in promoting film and theatre arts.

In 2008 Albeburgh Cinema was one of several in the UK which took part in the first live remote screening of a ballet from the National Theatre in London, using equipment provided by the government organized Digital Screen Network.

The theatre hosts a cinema club which in 2012 had about 1,200 members.

In 2013 the cinema employed the United Kingdom's oldest working projectionist, Neville Parry.

In 2015, the theatre was a comedy venue for the HighTide Festival.
