= Lo Recordings =

- Founded: 1995
- Founder: Jon Tye
- Country of origin: UK
- Location: Shoreditch, London
- Official website: http://www.lorecordings.com

Lo Recordings is a label founded in 1995 by Jon Tye. They are noted for their strong visual style thanks to Non-Format, with whom they work very closely and won a D&AD award for several of their releases sleeves.

== Musical style ==
Lo Recordings mainly specialize in left-field electronic music with artists such as Grimes, Black Devil, Susumu Yokota, and Fischerspooner amongst many others. This is reflected in the company's motto: "Lo Recordings – Provider of quality esoteric music since 1995".

Along with electronic music Lo Recordings has also released various other genres. This is exemplified by bands such as The Chap, who have seven albums on Lo.

Recently Lo have developed two new labels: Loaf, for new artists, and Loeb, for vinyl 12-inches. There is a sister company, Hub 100 Publishing Ltd, and in the last few years have developed a production music library imprint called Lo Editions in conjunction with BMGZomba production music.

Lo Recordings also runs Lo & Behold, a shop and creative space in London showcasing a diverse selection of exhibitions, installations and one-off events.

== Artists ==
Lo Recordings has worked with many artists and has over 70 releases spread over three sub-labels. These include many full albums and compilations. Some of the artists associated with Lo Recordings are:

- The Adamski Kid
- Four Tet
- The Chap
- Susumu Yokota
- Black Devil
- Rothko
- Aphex Twin
- Thurston Moore
- Luke Vibert
- Jean-Jacques Perrey
- Cursor Miner
- Hairy Butter
- Mileece
- Tony F Wilson
- Red Snapper
- Grimes
- Zoon van snooK
- Astronauts
- Tom Furse

== See also ==
- List of record labels
- List of electronic music record labels
