= Hilbert symbol =

Function used in local class field theory related to reciprocity laws

In mathematics, the Hilbert symbol or norm-residue symbol is a function (–, –) from K^{×} × K^{×} to the group of nth roots of unity in a local field K such as the fields of reals or p-adic numbers. It is related to reciprocity laws, and can be defined in terms of the Artin symbol of local class field theory. The Hilbert symbol was introduced by David Hilbert (1897, sections 64, 131, 1998, English translation) in his Zahlbericht, with the slight difference that he defined it for elements of global fields rather than for the larger local fields.

The Hilbert symbol has been generalized to higher local fields.

== Quadratic Hilbert symbol ==
Over a local field $K$ with multiplicative group of non-zero elements $K^\times$, the quadratic Hilbert symbol is the function $K^\times\times K^\times\to\{\pm 1\}$ defined by

$$(a,b)=\begin{cases}+1,&\mbox{ if }z^2=ax^2+by^2\mbox{ has a non-zero solution }(x,y,z)\in K^3;\\-1,&\mbox{ otherwise.}\end{cases}$$

Equivalently, $(a, b) = 1$ if and only if $b$ is equal to the norm of an element of the quadratic extension $K[\sqrt{a}]$.

=== Properties ===
The following three properties follow directly from the definition, by choosing suitable solutions of the Diophantine equation above:

- If $a$ is a square, then $(a,b)=1$ for all $b$.
- For all $a,b$ in $K^\times$, $(a,b)=(b,a)$.
- For any $a$ in $K^\times$ such that $a-1$ is also in $K^\times$, we have $(a,1-a)=1$.

The (bi)multiplicativity, i.e.,

$$(a,b_1b_2)=(a,b_1)\cdot(a,b_2)$$

for any $a,b_1$ and $b_2$ in $K^\times$ is, however, more difficult to prove, and requires the development of local class field theory.

The third property shows that the Hilbert symbol is an example of a Steinberg symbol and thus factors over the second Milnor K-group $K^M_2 (K)$, which is by definition

K^{×} ⊗ K^{×} / (a ⊗ (1−a), a ∈ K^{×} \ {1})

By the first property it even factors over $K^M_2 (K) / 2$. This is the first step towards the Milnor conjecture.

=== Interpretation as an algebra ===
The Hilbert symbol can also be used to denote the central simple algebra over K with basis 1,i,j,k and multiplication rules $i^2=a$, $j^2=b$, $ij=-ji=k$. In this case the algebra represents an element of order dividing 2 in the Brauer group of K, which is identified with -1 if it is a division algebra and +1 if it is isomorphic to the algebra of 2 by 2 matrices.

=== Hilbert symbols over the rationals ===
For a place v of the rational number field and rational numbers a, b we let (a, b)_{v} denote the value of the Hilbert symbol in the corresponding completion Q_{v}. As usual, if v is the valuation attached to a prime number p then the corresponding completion is the p-adic field and if v is the infinite place then the completion is the real number field.

Over the reals, (a, b)_{∞} is +1 if at least one of a or b is positive, and −1 if both are negative.

Over the p-adics with p odd, writing $a = p^{\alpha} u$ and $b = p^{\beta} v$, where u and v are integers coprime to p, we have

$(a,b)_p = (-1)^{\alpha\beta\epsilon(p)} \left(\frac{u}{p}\right)^\beta \left(\frac{v}{p}\right)^\alpha$, where $\epsilon(p) = (p-1)/2$

and the expression involves two Legendre symbols.

Over the 2-adics, again writing $a = 2^\alpha u$ and $b = 2^\beta v$, where u and v are odd numbers, we have

$(a,b)_2 = (-1)^{\epsilon(u)\epsilon(v) + \alpha\omega(v) + \beta\omega(u)}$, where $\omega(x) = (x^2-1)/8.$

It is known that if v ranges over all places, (a, b)_{v} is 1 for almost all places. Therefore, the following product formula

$$\prod_v (a,b)_v = 1$$

makes sense. It is equivalent to the law of quadratic reciprocity.

=== Kaplansky radical ===
The Hilbert symbol on a field F defines a map

$$(\cdot,\cdot) : F^*/F^{*2} \times F^*/F^{*2} \rightarrow \mathop{Br}(F)$$

where Br(F) is the Brauer group of F. The kernel of this mapping, the elements a such that (a,b)=1 for all b, is the Kaplansky radical of F.

The radical is a subgroup of F^{*}/F^{*2}, identified with a subgroup of F^{*}. The radical is equal to F^{*} if and only if F has u-invariant at most 2. In the opposite direction, a field with radical F^{*2} is termed a Hilbert field.

== The general Hilbert symbol ==
If K is a local field containing the group of nth roots of unity for some positive integer n prime to the characteristic of K, then the Hilbert symbol (,) is a function from K*×K* to μ_{n}. In terms of the Artin symbol it can be defined by

$$(a,b)\sqrt[n]{b} = (a,K(\sqrt[n]{b})/K)\sqrt[n]{b}$$

Hilbert originally defined the Hilbert symbol before the Artin symbol was discovered, and his definition (for n prime) used the power residue symbol when K has residue characteristic coprime to n, and was rather complicated when K has residue characteristic dividing n.

=== Properties ===
The Hilbert symbol is (multiplicatively) bilinear:

(ab,c) = (a,c)(b,c)
(a,bc) = (a,b)(a,c)

skew symmetric:

(a,b) = (b,a)^{−1}

nondegenerate:

(a,b)=1 for all b if and only if a is in K*^{n}

It detects norms (hence the name norm residue symbol):

(a,b)=1 if and only if a is a norm of an element in K(^{n}√b)

It has the "symbol" properties:

(a,1–a)=1, (a,–a)=1.

=== Hilbert's reciprocity law ===
Hilbert's reciprocity law states that if a and b are in an algebraic number field containing the nth roots of unity then

$$\prod_p (a,b)_p=1$$

where the product is over the finite and infinite primes p of the number field, and where (,)_{p} is the Hilbert symbol of the completion at p. Hilbert's reciprocity law follows from the Artin reciprocity law and the definition of the Hilbert symbol in terms of the Artin symbol.

=== Power residue symbol ===
If K is a number field containing the nth roots of unity, p is a prime ideal not dividing n, π is a prime element of the local field of p, and a is coprime to p, then the power residue symbol (^{a}_{p}) is related to the Hilbert symbol by

$$\binom{a}{p} = (\pi,a)_p$$

The power residue symbol is extended to fractional ideals by multiplicativity, and defined for elements of the number field by putting (^{a}_{b})=(^{a}_{(b)}) where (b) is the principal ideal generated by b. Hilbert's reciprocity law then implies the following reciprocity law for the residue symbol, for a and b prime to each other and to n:

$$\binom{a}{b}=\binom{b}{a}\prod_{p|n,\infty}(a,b)_p$$

== See also ==
- Azumaya algebra
