= Contou-Carrère symbol =

In mathematics, the Contou-Carrère symbol, named after Carlos Contou-Carrère, is a Steinberg symbol defined on pairs of invertible elements of the ring of Laurent power series over an Artinian ring $k$, taking values in the group of units of $k$.

== Definition ==
If $k$ is an Artinian local ring, then any invertible formal Laurent series $a$ with coefficients in $k$ can be written uniquely as

$$a=a_0t^{w(a)}\prod_{i\ne 0}(1-a_it^i),$$

where $w(a)$ is an integer, $a_0$ is a unit, and the elements $a_i$ are in $k$, and are in $m$ for $i<0$.

The Contou-Carrère symbol $\langle a,b\rangle$ of $a$ and $b$ is defined to be

$$\langle a,b\rangle=(-1)^{w(a)w(b)}\frac{a_0^{w(b)}\prod_{i,j>0}(1-a_i^{j/(i,j)}b_{-j}^{i/(i,j)})^{(i,j)}}
{b_0^{w(a)}\prod_{i,j>0}(1-b_i^{j/(i,j)}a_{-j}^{i/(i,j)})^{(i,j)}}.$$
