= Sakura (Susumu Yokota album) =

Studio album by Susumu Yokota
- Released: September 11, 2000
- Genre: Ambient
- Length: 50:13
- Label: Skintone Records

Susumu Yokota chronology
1999 (1999)	Sakura (2000)	Mix (1999)

Professional ratings
Review scores
Source	Rating
Allmusic	4.5/5 stars
Pitchfork Media	(8.4/10)

Sakura is a full-length album from electronic artist Susumu Yokota, released in 1999 in Japan on Skintone Records (STR03) and on 11 September 2000 in the United Kingdom on The Leaf Label (BAY13). It was named as the top electronic release of the year 2000 by The Wire.

Some tracks sample elements of Harold Budd's album "The Pavilion of Dreams". Track two, "Tobiume", samples the opening track ("Bismillahi 'Rrahmani 'Rahim"); track four, "Hagoromo", features a sample from "Let Us Go Into The House of the Lord/Butterfly Sunday", and track eleven - "Shinsen" - opens with a sample from "Rosetti Noise/Chrystal Garden and a Coda".

Track six, "Gekkoh", features a sample from the opening of Steve Reich's "Music for 18 Musicians", and also contains elements of Young Marble Giants' "The Taxi" (from their album Colossal Youth).

Track eight, "Azukiiro No Kaori", contains samples from the Return to Forever song "Sometime Ago/La Fiesta" from Return to Forever.

Track nine, "Kodomotachi", features a sample from Joni Mitchell's song "Songs to Aging Children Come" from Clouds.

Track ten, "Naminote", features a sample from Chick Corea & Gary Burton's track "Señor Mouse" from Crystal Silence.

The cover features an illustration of swallows flying on a datura tree and a Guitguit sitting on an orange tree. The illustration is plate 14 in the monography: "Le Muséum d'histoire naturelle" by Paul-Antoine Cap (1788-1877).

== Track listing ==
All tracks are written by Susumu Yokota.

No.	Title	Length
1.	"Saku"	5:45
2.	"Tobiume"	4:38
3.	"Uchu Tanjyo"	3:13
4.	"Hagoromo"	3:52
5.	"Genshi"	4:57
6.	"Gekkoh"	4:59
7.	"Hisen"	3:48
8.	"Azukiiro no Kaori"	2:39
9.	"Kodomotachi"	4:06
10.	"Naminote"	5:43
11.	"Shinsen"	4:33
12.	"Kirakiraboshi"	1:55

=== Double-LP ===
Disc one – side A
No.	Title	Length
1.	"Saku"	5:45
2.	"Uchu Tanjyo"	3:13
3.	"Hagoromo"	3:52

Disc one – side B
No.	Title	Length
4.	"Genshi"	4:57
5.	"Gekkoh"	4:59
6.	"Kirakiraboshi"	1:55

Disc two – side A
No.	Title	Length
1.	"Kodomotachi"	4:06
2.	"Hisen"	3:48
3.	"Tobiume"	4:38

Disc two – side B
No.	Title	Length
4.	"Naminote"	5:43
5.	"Shinsen"	4:33
6.	"Azukiiro no Kaori"	2:39

== Charts ==
Chart performance for Sakura
Chart (2025)	Peak position
UK Dance Albums (OCC)	5
