= Discovery (British TV programme) =

Discovery is a British documentary television programme, produced by Duncan Dallas, for Yorkshire Television. It was first shown in England in 1974.

The first episode was about the post-encephalitic patients described by the neurologist Oliver Sacks (see Awakenings). The documentary won a Red Ribbon at the 1978 American Film Festival and first prize at the 1978 International Rehabilitation Film Festival.
