= Power residue symbol =

In algebraic number theory the n-th power residue symbol (for an integer n > 2) is a generalization of the (quadratic) Legendre symbol to n-th powers. These symbols are used in the statement and proof of cubic, quartic, Eisenstein, and related higher reciprocity laws.

== Background and notation ==
Let k be an algebraic number field with ring of integers $\mathcal{O}_k$ that contains a primitive n-th root of unity $\zeta_n.$

Let $\mathfrak{p} \subset \mathcal{O}_k$ be a prime ideal and assume that n and $\mathfrak{p}$ are coprime (i.e. $n \not \in \mathfrak{p}$.)

The norm of $\mathfrak{p}$ is defined as the cardinality of the residue class ring (note that since $\mathfrak{p}$ is prime the residue class ring is a finite field):

$$\mathrm{N} \mathfrak{p} := |\mathcal{O}_k / \mathfrak{p}|.$$

An analogue of Fermat's theorem holds in $\mathcal{O}_k.$ If $\alpha \in \mathcal{O}_k - \mathfrak{p},$ then

$$\alpha^{\mathrm{N} \mathfrak{p} -1}\equiv 1 \bmod{\mathfrak{p}}.$$

And finally, suppose $\mathrm{N} \mathfrak{p} \equiv 1 \bmod{n}.$ These facts imply that

$$\alpha^{\frac{\mathrm{N} \mathfrak{p} -1}{n}}\equiv \zeta_n^s\bmod{\mathfrak{p} }$$

is well-defined and congruent to a unique $n$-th root of unity $\zeta_n^s.$

== Definition ==
This root of unity is called the n-th power residue symbol for $\mathcal{O}_k,$ and is denoted by

$$\left(\frac{\alpha}{\mathfrak{p} }\right)_n= \zeta_n^s \equiv \alpha^{\frac{\mathrm{N} \mathfrak{p} -1}{n}}\bmod{\mathfrak{p}}.$$

== Properties ==
The n-th power symbol has properties completely analogous to those of the classical (quadratic) Jacobi symbol ($\zeta$ is a fixed primitive $n$-th root of unity):

$$\left(\frac{\alpha}{\mathfrak{p} }\right)_n = \begin{cases}
0 & \alpha\in\mathfrak{p}\\
1 & \alpha\not\in\mathfrak{p}\text{ and } \exists \eta \in\mathcal{O}_k : \alpha \equiv \eta^n \bmod{\mathfrak{p}}\\
\zeta  & \alpha\not\in\mathfrak{p}\text{ and there is no such }\eta
\end{cases}$$

In all cases (zero and nonzero)

$$\left(\frac{\alpha}{\mathfrak{p}}\right)_n \equiv \alpha^{\frac{\mathrm{N} \mathfrak{p} -1}{n}}\bmod{\mathfrak{p}}.$$
$$\left(\frac{\alpha}{\mathfrak{p}}\right)_n \left(\frac{\beta}{\mathfrak{p}}\right)_n = \left(\frac{\alpha\beta}{\mathfrak{p} }\right)_n$$
$$\alpha \equiv\beta\bmod{\mathfrak{p}} \quad \Rightarrow \quad  \left(\frac{\alpha}{\mathfrak{p} }\right)_n  = \left(\frac{\beta}{\mathfrak{p} }\right)_n$$

All power residue symbols mod n are Dirichlet characters mod n, and the m-th power residue symbol only contains the m-th roots of unity, the m-th power residue symbol mod n exists if and only if m divides $\lambda(n)$ (the Carmichael lambda function of n).

== Relation to the Hilbert symbol ==
The n-th power residue symbol is related to the Hilbert symbol $(\cdot,\cdot)_{\mathfrak{p}}$ for the prime $\mathfrak{p}$ by

$$\left(\frac{\alpha}{\mathfrak{p} }\right)_n = (\pi, \alpha)_{\mathfrak{p}}$$

in the case $\mathfrak{p}$ coprime to n, where $\pi$ is any uniformising element for the local field $K_{\mathfrak{p}}$.

== Generalizations ==
The $n$-th power symbol may be extended to take non-prime ideals or non-zero elements as its "denominator", in the same way that the Jacobi symbol extends the Legendre symbol.

Any ideal $\mathfrak{a}\subset\mathcal{O}_k$ is the product of prime ideals, and in one way only:

$$\mathfrak{a} = \mathfrak{p}_1 \cdots\mathfrak{p}_g.$$

The $n$-th power symbol is extended multiplicatively:

$$\left(\frac{\alpha}{\mathfrak{a} }\right)_n = \left(\frac{\alpha}{\mathfrak{p}_1 }\right)_n  \cdots \left(\frac{\alpha}{\mathfrak{p}_g }\right)_n.$$

For $0 \neq \beta\in\mathcal{O}_k$ then we define

$$\left(\frac{\alpha}{\beta}\right)_n := \left(\frac{\alpha}{(\beta) }\right)_n,$$

where $(\beta)$ is the principal ideal generated by $\beta.$

Analogous to the quadratic Jacobi symbol, this symbol is multiplicative in the top and bottom parameters.

- If $\alpha\equiv\beta\bmod{\mathfrak{a}}$ then $\left(\tfrac{\alpha}{\mathfrak{a} }\right)_n = \left(\tfrac{\beta}{\mathfrak{a} }\right)_n.$
- $\left(\tfrac{\alpha}{\mathfrak{a} }\right)_n \left(\tfrac{\beta}{\mathfrak{a} }\right)_n = \left(\tfrac{\alpha\beta}{\mathfrak{a} }\right)_n.$
- $\left(\tfrac{\alpha}{\mathfrak{a} }\right)_n \left(\tfrac{\alpha}{\mathfrak{b} }\right)_n = \left(\tfrac{\alpha}{\mathfrak{ab} }\right)_n.$

Since the symbol is always an $n$-th root of unity, because of its multiplicativity it is equal to 1 whenever one parameter is an $n$-th power; the converse is not true.

- If $\alpha\equiv\eta^n\bmod{\mathfrak{a}}$ then $\left(\tfrac{\alpha}{\mathfrak{a} }\right)_n =1.$
- If $\left(\tfrac{\alpha}{\mathfrak{a} }\right)_n \neq 1$ then $\alpha$ is not an $n$-th power modulo $\mathfrak{a}.$
- If $\left(\tfrac{\alpha}{\mathfrak{a} }\right)_n =1$ then $\alpha$ may or may not be an $n$-th power modulo $\mathfrak{a}.$

== Power reciprocity law ==
The power reciprocity law, the analogue of the law of quadratic reciprocity, may be formulated in terms of the Hilbert symbols as

$$\left({\frac{\alpha}{\beta}}\right)_n \left({\frac{\beta}{\alpha}}\right)_n^{-1} = \prod_{\mathfrak{p} | n\infty} (\alpha,\beta)_{\mathfrak{p}},$$

whenever $\alpha$ and $\beta$ are coprime.

== See also ==
- Modular_arithmetic#Residue_class
- Quadratic_residue#Prime_power_modulus
- Artin symbol
- Gauss's lemma
