= Reciprocity law =

Mathematical law, a generalization of quadratic reciprocity

In mathematics, a reciprocity law is a generalization of the law of quadratic reciprocity to arbitrary monic irreducible polynomials $f(x)$ with integer coefficients. Recall that first reciprocity law, quadratic reciprocity, determines when an irreducible polynomial $f(x) = x^2 + ax + b$ splits into linear terms when reduced mod $p$. That is, it determines for which prime numbers the relation

$f(x) \equiv f_p(x) = (x-n_p)(x-m_p) \text{ } (\text{mod } p)$

holds. For a general reciprocity law^{pg 3}, it is defined as the rule determining which primes $p$ the polynomial $f_p$ splits into linear factors, denoted $\text{Spl}\{f(x) \}$.

There are several different ways to express reciprocity laws. The early reciprocity laws found in the 19th century were usually expressed in terms of a power residue symbol (p/q) generalizing the quadratic reciprocity symbol, that describes when a prime number is an nth power residue modulo another prime, and gave a relation between (p/q) and (q/p). Hilbert reformulated the reciprocity laws as saying that a product over p of Hilbert norm residue symbols (a,b/p), taking values in roots of unity, is equal to 1. Artin reformulated the reciprocity laws as a statement that the Artin symbol from ideals (or ideles) to elements of a Galois group is trivial on a certain subgroup. Several more recent generalizations express reciprocity laws using cohomology of groups or representations of adelic groups or algebraic K-groups, and their relationship with the original quadratic reciprocity law can be hard to see.

The name reciprocity law was coined by Legendre in his 1785 publication Recherches d'analyse indéterminée, because odd primes reciprocate or not in the sense of quadratic reciprocity stated below according to their residue classes $\bmod 4$. This reciprocating behavior does not generalize well, the equivalent splitting behavior does. The name reciprocity law is still used in the more general context of splittings.

== Quadratic reciprocity ==
In terms of the Legendre symbol, the law of quadratic reciprocity states

for positive odd primes 
  
    
      
        p
        ,
        q
      
    
    {\displaystyle p,q}
  
 we have 
  
    
      
        
          (
          
            
              p
              q
            
          
          )
        
        
          (
          
            
              q
              p
            
          
          )
        
        =
        (
        −
        1
        
          )
          
            
              
                
                  p
                  −
                  1
                
                2
              
            
            
              
                
                  q
                  −
                  1
                
                2
              
            
          
        
        .
      
    
    {\displaystyle \left({\frac {p}{q}}\right)\left({\frac {q}{p}}\right)=(-1)^{{\frac {p-1}{2}}{\frac {q-1}{2}}}.}
  

Using the definition of the Legendre symbol this is equivalent to a more elementary statement about equations.

For positive odd primes 
  
    
      
        p
        ,
        q
      
    
    {\displaystyle p,q}
  
 the solubility of 
  
    
      
        
          n
          
            2
          
        
        −
        p
        ≡
        0
        
          mod
          
            q
          
        
      
    
    {\displaystyle n^{2}-p\equiv 0{\bmod {q}}}
  
 for 
  
    
      
        n
      
    
    {\displaystyle n}
  
 determines the solubility of 
  
    
      
        
          m
          
            2
          
        
        −
        q
        ≡
        0
        
          mod
          
            p
          
        
      
    
    {\displaystyle m^{2}-q\equiv 0{\bmod {p}}}
  
 for 
  
    
      
        m
      
    
    {\displaystyle m}
  
 and vice versa by the comparatively simple criterion whether 
  
    
      
        (
        −
        1
        
          )
          
            
              
                
                  p
                  −
                  1
                
                2
              
            
            
              
                
                  q
                  −
                  1
                
                2
              
            
          
        
      
    
    {\displaystyle (-1)^{{\frac {p-1}{2}}{\frac {q-1}{2}}}}
  
 is 
  
    
      
        1
      
    
    {\displaystyle 1}
  
 or 
  
    
      
        −
        1
      
    
    {\displaystyle -1}
  
.

By the factor theorem and the behavior of degrees in factorizations the solubility of such quadratic congruence equations is equivalent to the splitting of associated quadratic polynomials over a residue ring into linear factors. In this terminology the law of quadratic reciprocity is stated as follows.

For positive odd primes 
  
    
      
        p
        ,
        q
      
    
    {\displaystyle p,q}
  
 the splitting of the polynomial 
  
    
      
        
          x
          
            2
          
        
        −
        p
      
    
    {\displaystyle x^{2}-p}
  
 in 
  
    
      
        
          mod
          
            q
          
        
      
    
    {\displaystyle {\bmod {q}}}
  
-residues determines the splitting of the polynomial 
  
    
      
        
          x
          
            2
          
        
        −
        q
      
    
    {\displaystyle x^{2}-q}
  
 in 
  
    
      
        
          mod
          
            p
          
        
      
    
    {\displaystyle {\bmod {p}}}
  
-residues and vice versa through the quantity 
  
    
      
        (
        −
        1
        
          )
          
            
              
                
                  p
                  −
                  1
                
                2
              
            
            
              
                
                  q
                  −
                  1
                
                2
              
            
          
        
        ∈
        {
        ±
        1
        }
      
    
    {\displaystyle (-1)^{{\frac {p-1}{2}}{\frac {q-1}{2}}}\in \{\pm 1\}}
  
.

This establishes the bridge from the name giving reciprocating behavior of primes introduced by Legendre to the splitting behavior of polynomials used in the generalizations.

== Cubic reciprocity ==
The law of cubic reciprocity for Eisenstein integers states that if α and β are primary (primes congruent to 2 mod 3) then

$$\Bigg(\frac{\alpha}{\beta}\Bigg)_3 = \Bigg(\frac{\beta}{\alpha}\Bigg)_3.$$

== Quartic reciprocity ==
In terms of the quartic residue symbol, the law of quartic reciprocity for Gaussian integers states that if π and θ are primary (congruent to 1 mod (1+i)^{3}) Gaussian primes then

$$\Bigg[\frac{\pi}{\theta}\Bigg]\left[\frac{\theta}{\pi}\right]^{-1}=
(-1)^{\frac{N\pi - 1}{4}\frac{N\theta-1}{4}}.$$

== Eisenstein reciprocity ==
Suppose that ζ is an $l$th root of unity for some odd prime $l$. The power character is the power of ζ such that

$$\left(\frac{\alpha}{\mathfrak{p}}\right)_l \equiv \alpha^{\frac{N(\mathfrak{p})-1}{l}} \pmod {\mathfrak{p}}$$

for any prime ideal $\mathfrak{p}$ of Z[ζ]. It is extended to other ideals by multiplicativity. The Eisenstein reciprocity law states that

$$\left(\frac{a}{\alpha}\right)_l=\left(\frac{\alpha}{a}\right)_l$$

for a any rational integer coprime to $l$ and α any element of Z[ζ] that is coprime to a and $l$ and congruent to a rational integer modulo (1–ζ)^{2}.

== Kummer reciprocity ==
Suppose that ζ is an lth root of unity for some odd regular prime l. Since l is regular, we can extend the symbol {} to ideals in a unique way such that

$\left\{\frac{p}{q}\right\}^n=\left\{\frac{p^n}{q}\right\}$ where n is some integer prime to l such that p^{n} is principal.

The Kummer reciprocity law states that

$$\left\{\frac{p}{q}\right\}=\left\{\frac{q}{p}\right\}$$

for p and q any distinct prime ideals of Z[ζ] other than (1–ζ).

== Hilbert reciprocity ==
In terms of the Hilbert symbol, Hilbert's reciprocity law for an algebraic number field states that

$$\prod_v (a,b)_v = 1$$

where the product is over all finite and infinite places. Over the rational numbers this is equivalent to the law of quadratic reciprocity. To see this take a and b to be distinct odd primes. Then Hilbert's law becomes $(p,q)_\infty(p,q)_2(p,q)_p(p,q)_q=1$ But (p,q)_{p} is equal to the Legendre symbol, (p,q)_{∞} is 1 if one of p and q is positive and –1 otherwise, and (p,q)_{2} is (–1)^{(p–1)(q–1)/4}. So for p and q positive odd primes Hilbert's law is the law of quadratic reciprocity.

== Artin reciprocity ==
In the language of ideles, the Artin reciprocity law for a finite extension L/K states that the Artin map from the idele class group C_{K} to the abelianization Gal(L/K)^{ab} of the Galois group vanishes on N_{L/K}(C_{L}), and induces an isomorphism

$$\theta: C_K/{N_{L/K}(C_L)} \to \text{Gal}(L/K)^{\text{ab}}.$$

Although it is not immediately obvious, the Artin reciprocity law easily implies all the previously discovered reciprocity laws, by applying it to suitable extensions L/K. For example, in the special case when K contains the nth roots of unity and L=K[a^{1/n}] is a Kummer extension of K, the fact that the Artin map vanishes on N_{L/K}(C_{L}) implies Hilbert's reciprocity law for the Hilbert symbol.

== Local reciprocity ==
Hasse introduced a local analogue of the Artin reciprocity law, called the local reciprocity law. One form of it states that for a finite abelian extension of L/K of local fields, the Artin map is an isomorphism from $K^{\times}/N_{L/K}(L^{\times})$ onto the Galois group $Gal(L/K)$.

== Explicit reciprocity laws ==
In order to get a classical style reciprocity law from the Hilbert reciprocity law Π(a,b)_{p}=1, one needs to know the values of (a,b)_{p} for p dividing n. Explicit formulas for this are sometimes called explicit reciprocity laws.

== Power reciprocity laws ==
A power reciprocity law may be formulated as an analogue of the law of quadratic reciprocity in terms of the Hilbert symbols as

$$\left({\frac{\alpha}{\beta}}\right)_n \left({\frac{\beta}{\alpha}}\right)_n^{-1} = \prod_{\mathfrak{p} | n\infty} (\alpha,\beta)_{\mathfrak{p}} \ .$$

== Rational reciprocity laws ==
A rational reciprocity law is one stated in terms of rational integers without the use of roots of unity.

== Langlands reciprocity ==
The Langlands program includes several conjectures for general reductive algebraic groups, which for the special of the group GL_{1} imply the Artin reciprocity law.

== Yamamoto's reciprocity law ==
Yamamoto's reciprocity law is a reciprocity law related to class numbers of quadratic number fields.

== See also ==
- Hilbert's ninth problem
- Stanley's reciprocity theorem
