= The World This Week =

Israeli news show

The World This Week (TWTW), is a weekly current events and news show anchored by Ya'akov Eilon. The show broadcasts in Hebrew to an Israeli audience via Keshet's Channel 2 every Thursday from 22:50-23:20, as well as in English for an international audience via i24news channel every Sunday.

The show collects, interprets and summarizes main global events that took place during the week from unique and creative angles. Every week the show exhibits specialist guests who provide meaningful insight on international affairs. The show also activates correspondents around the globe in places such as Beijing, New York, Los Angeles, Brazil and more.
