= Susumu Yokota =

Japanese composer

Background information
- Also known as: Ebi; Stevia; Tenshin
- Born: 22 April 1960; Toyama, Japan
- Died: 27 March 2015 (aged 54) Japan
- Genres: Ambient
- Occupation: Musician
- Years active: c.1992-2014

Susumu Yokota (横田 進 Yokota Susumu, or ススム・ヨコタ Susumu Yokota; 22 April 1960 – 27 March 2015) was a Japanese record producer and composer. He released several albums under pseudonyms including Stevia, Ebi, and others.

== Biography ==
Yokota was well known in the English-speaking independent music scene for his albums of experimental ambient music, including albums like Acid Mt. Fuji and Sakura. He also had a long career as a house music DJ and released several highly regarded albums of house music.

Before beginning his career as a DJ and producer, Yokota studied economics at university alongside graphic design. After an extended period of travelling in India, he returned to Tokyo to establish himself as a designer, with works ranging from interior design to book covers.

Yokota's musical debut was a three-track EP titled Brainthump, released under the pseudonym TENSHIN alongside his friend Makoto on German label No Respect Records. Following this, his first solo record was released on German techno label Harthouse under the pseudonym Frankfurt-Tokyo-Connection. Yokota founded the label Skintone in 1998, named after the deep house night he organised in Ebisu, Tokyo.

== Death ==
Susumu Yokota died on 27 March 2015, aged 54, after a long period of illness.
