= Primes in arithmetic progression =

Set of prime numbers linked by a linear relationship

In number theory, primes in arithmetic progression are any sequence of at least three prime numbers that are consecutive terms in an arithmetic progression. An example is the sequence of primes (3, 7, 11), which is given by $a_n = 3 + 4n$ for $0 \le n \le 2$.

According to the Green–Tao theorem, there exist arbitrarily long arithmetic progressions in the sequence of primes. Sometimes the phrase may also be used about primes which belong to an arithmetic progression which also contains composite numbers. For example, it can be used about primes in an arithmetic progression of the form $an + b$, where a and b are coprime which according to Dirichlet's theorem on arithmetic progressions contains infinitely many primes, along with infinitely many composites.

For any integer $k\geq 3$, an AP-k (also called PAP-k) is any sequence of $k$ primes in arithmetic progression. An AP-$k$ can be written as $k$ primes of the form $an+b$, for fixed integers $a$ (called the common difference) and $b$, and $k$ consecutive integer values of $n$. An AP-k is usually expressed with $n=0$ to $k-1$. This can always be achieved by defining $b$ to be the first prime in the arithmetic progression.

== Properties ==
Any given arithmetic progression of primes has a finite length. In 2004, Ben J. Green and Terence Tao settled an old conjecture by proving the Green–Tao theorem: the primes contain arbitrarily long arithmetic progressions. It follows immediately that there are infinitely many AP-$k$ for any $k$.

If an AP-$k$ does not begin with the prime $k$, then the common difference is a multiple of the primorial $k\#=2\cdot 3\cdot 5\cdots j$, where $j$ is the largest prime $\leq k$.

Proof: Let the AP-$k$ be $an+b$ for $k$ consecutive values of $n$. If a prime $p$ does not divide $a$, then modular arithmetic says that $p$ will divide every $p$th term of the arithmetic progression. (From H.J. Weber, Cor.10 in "Exceptional Prime Number Twins, Triplets and Multiplets," arXiv:1102.3075[math.NT]. See also Theor.2.3 in "Regularities of Twin, Triplet and Multiplet Prime Numbers," arXiv:1103.0447[math.NT], Global J.P.A.Math 8(2012), in press.) If the AP is prime for $k$ consecutive values, then $a$ must therefore be divisible by all primes $p\leq k$.

This also shows that an AP with common difference $a$ cannot contain more consecutive prime terms than the value of the smallest prime that does not divide $a$.

If $k$ is prime then an AP-$k$ can begin with $k$ and have a common difference which is only a multiple of $(k-1)\#$ instead of $k\#$. (From H. J. Weber, ``Less Regular Exceptional and Repeating Prime Number Multiplets," arXiv:1105.4092[math.NT], Sect.3.) For example, the AP-3 with primes $\{3,5,7\}$ and common difference $2\#=2$, or the AP-5 with primes $\{5,11,17,23,29\}$ and common difference $4\#=6$. It is conjectured that such examples exist for all primes $k$. As of 2018, the largest prime for which this is confirmed is $k=19$, for this AP-19 found by Wojciech Iżykowski in 2013:

$19 + 4244193265542951705\cdot 17\#\cdot n$, for $n=0$ to $18$.

It follows from widely believed conjectures, such as Dickson's conjecture and some variants of the prime k-tuple conjecture, that if $p>2$ is the smallest prime not dividing $a$, then there are infinitely many AP-($p-1$) with common difference $a$. For example, 5 is the smallest prime not dividing 6, so there is expected to be infinitely many AP-4 with common difference 6, which is called a sexy prime quadruplet. When $a=2$, $p=3$, it is the twin prime conjecture, with an "AP-2" of 2 primes $(b,b+2)$.

== Minimal primes in AP ==
We minimize the last term.

Minimal AP-k
k	Primes for n = 0 to k−1
3	3 + 2n
4	5 + 6n
5	5 + 6n
6	7 + 30n
7	7 + 150n
8	199 + 210n
9	199 + 210n
10	199 + 210n
11	110437 + 13860n
12	110437 + 13860n
13	4943 + 60060n
14	31385539 + 420420n
15	115453391 + 4144140n
16	53297929 + 9699690n
17	3430751869 + 87297210n
18	4808316343 + 717777060n
19	8297644387 + 4180566390n
20	214861583621 + 18846497670n
21	5749146449311 + 26004868890n
22	19261849254523 + 784801917900n
23	403185216600637 + 2124513401010n

== Largest known primes in AP ==
For a prime $q$, $q\#$ denotes the primorial $2\cdot 3\cdot 5\cdot 7\cdots q$.

As of September 2019, the longest known AP-$k$ is an AP-27. Several examples are known for AP-26. The first to be discovered was found on April 12, 2010, by Benoît Perichon on a PlayStation 3 with software by Jarosław Wróblewski and Geoff Reynolds, ported to the PlayStation 3 by Bryan Little, in a distributed PrimeGrid project:

43142746595714191 + 23681770·23#·n, for n = 0 to 25. (23# = 223092870) (sequence A204189 in the OEIS)

By the time the first AP-26 was found the search was divided into 131,436,182 segments by PrimeGrid and processed by 32/64bit CPUs, Nvidia CUDA GPUs, and Cell microprocessors around the world.

Before that, the record was an AP-25 found by Raanan Chermoni and Jarosław Wróblewski on May 17, 2008:

$6171054912832631 + 366384\cdot 23\#\cdot n$, for $n=0$ to $24$. ($23\# = 223092870$)

The AP-25 search was divided into segments taking about 3 minutes on Athlon 64 and Wróblewski reported "I think Raanan went through less than 10,000,000 such segments" (this would have taken about 57 cpu years on Athlon 64).

The earlier record was an AP-24 found by Jarosław Wróblewski alone on January 18, 2007:

$468395662504823 + 205619\cdot 23\#\cdot n$, for $n=0$ to $23$.

For this Wróblewski reported he used a total of 75 computers: 15 64-bit Athlons, 15 dual core 64-bit Pentium D 805, 30 32-bit Athlons 2500, and 15 Durons 900.

The following table shows the largest known AP-$k$ with the year of discovery and the number of decimal digits in the ending prime. Note that the largest known AP-$k$ may be the end of an AP-($k+1$). Some record setters choose to first compute a large set of primes of form $c\cdot p\#+1$ with fixed $p$, and then search for AP's among the values of $c$ that produced a prime. This is reflected in the expression for some records. The expression can easily be rewritten as $an+b$.

Largest known AP-k as of November 2026
k	Primes for n = 0 to k−1	Digits	Year	Discoverer
3	(503·2^{1092022}−1) + (1103·2^{3558176} − 503·2^{1092022})·n	1071122	2022	Ryan Propper, Serge Batalov
4	(4599280 + 6519272·n)·104561# + 1	45260	2025	Serge Batalov
5	(108992777 + 20571563·n)·32003#+1	13773	2025	Serge Batalov
6	(4077098059 + 4441450082·n)·24499# + 1	10594	2024	Peter Kaiser
7	(2554152639 + 577051223·n)·7927# + 1	3407	2022	Serge Batalov
8	(48098104751 + 3026809034·n)·5303# + 1	2271	2019	Norman Luhn, Paul Underwood, Ken Davis
9	(1966563924243 + 241047628·n)·2459# + 1	1060	2026	Arnav Garg
10	(44720058864 + 31313885·n)·1193# + 1	512	2024	Norman Luhn
11	(28337704382 + 2782501868·n)·821# + 1	350	2025	Norman Luhn
12	(145330438399 + 819928252·n)·461# + 1	202	2026	Arnav Garg
13	(39327544577 + 2409897269·n)·349# + 1	152	2026	Norman Luhn
14	(541343583659 + 2878343921·n)·229# + 1	104	2026	Arnav Garg
15	(198301127768 + 848309427·n)·163# + 1	76	2026	Arnav Garg
16	(56697051053 + 549530149·n)·127# + 1	60	2026	Norman Luhn
17	(56147520904 + 549530149·n)·127# + 1	60	2026	Norman Luhn
18	(35111058160 + 1094584269·n)·73# + 1	40	2026	Norman Luhn
19	(34016473891 + 1094584269·n)·73# + 1	40	2026	Norman Luhn
20	(3800687715 + 913281461·n)·53# + 1	30	2025	Norman Luhn
21	(65374983581321010 + n)·19# + 7456123	24	2026	Joris Perrenet
22	22231637631603420833 + 8·41#·(n + 1)	20	2014	Jarosław Wróblewski
23	22231637631603420833 + 8·41#·n	20	2014	Jarosław Wróblewski
24	(2364125960 + 512989143·n)·23# + 1192577	19	2026	Kai Presler, PrimeGrid
25	(1270749461 + 543250375·n)·23# + 179208467	19	2026	Kai Presler, PrimeGrid
26	(216517777 + 531515022·n)·23# + 148739693	19	2026	Christian Carquillat, PrimeGrid
27	(4361612620 + 174505864·n)·23# + 184607939	19	2026	Kai Presler, PrimeGrid

== Consecutive primes in arithmetic progression ==
Consecutive primes in arithmetic progression refers to at least three consecutive primes which are consecutive terms in an arithmetic progression. Note that unlike an AP-$k$, all the other numbers between the terms of the progression must be composite. For example, the AP-3 {3, 7, 11} does not qualify, because 5 is also a prime.

For an integer $k\geq 3$, a CPAP-k is $k$ consecutive primes in arithmetic progression. It is conjectured there are arbitrarily long CPAP's. This would imply infinitely many CPAP-$k$ for all $k$. The middle prime in a CPAP-3 is called a balanced prime. The largest known as of 2022 has 15004 digits.

The first known CPAP-10 was found in 1998 by Manfred Toplic in the distributed computing project CP10 which was organized by Harvey Dubner, Tony Forbes, Nik Lygeros, Michel Mizony and Paul Zimmermann. This CPAP-10 has the smallest possible common difference, 7# = 210. The only other known CPAP-10 as of 2018 was found by the same people in 2008.

If a CPAP-11 exists then it must have a common difference which is a multiple of 11# = 2310. The difference between the first and last of the 11 primes would therefore be a multiple of 23100. The requirement for at least 23090 composite numbers between the 11 primes makes it appear extremely hard to find a CPAP-11. Dubner and Zimmermann estimate it would be at least 10^{12} times harder than a CPAP-10.

== Minimal consecutive primes in AP ==
The first occurrence of a CPAP-$k$ is only known for $k\leq 6$ (sequence A006560 in the OEIS).

Minimal CPAP-k
k	Primes for n = 0 to k−1
3	3 + 2n
4	251 + 6n
5	9843019 + 30n
6	121174811 + 30n

== Largest known consecutive primes in AP ==
The table shows the largest known case of $k$ consecutive primes in arithmetic progression, for $k=3$ to $10$.

Largest known CPAP-k as of October 2026,
k	Primes for n = 0 to k−1	Digits	Year	Discoverer
3	17484430616589 · 2^{54201} − 7 + 6n	16330	2024	Serge Batalov
4	35734184537 · 11677#/3 − 9 + 6n	5002	2024	Serge Batalov
5	2167681045402 · 4663# + 3399421517 + 30n	2006	2026	Serge Batalov
6	533098369554 · 2357# + 3399421517 + 30n	1012	2021	Serge Batalov
7	216229301693757 · 1201# + x_{216} + 210n	518	2026	Serge Batalov
8	329033474237114 · 761# + x_{215} + 210n	333	2026	Serge Batalov
9	8365691496856241 · 557# + x_{217} + 210n	242	2026	Serge Batalov
10	1565650010585895 · 389# + x_{159} + 210n	174	2026	Serge Batalov

x_{d} is a d-digit number used in one of the above records to ensure a small factor in unusually many of the required composites between the primes.
x_{159} = 1253295346839361069 83206866890864084738 41263552105487292666 40979349651418919961 83013465474113516807 11116649137055064953 23925061966862709078 10791018777809948059
x_{215} = 493452905420156 96023949928025713472 01835957728850608808 49167483192921257956 77132129504690990418 08650416037489042390 56959406627129984749 39478594072852653006 48333486301976404359 99766056867343647729 89908539223019818949
x_{216} = 3170270091718350 40589342262856286539 58981820062087092935 02202456037281906234 98294958341142437240 42776688948423367917 32839941523071745031 19182789275623156031 86953428020622792634 05259813255464337794 70362962167933051651
x_{217} = 19628563796416418 77697073325889993057 61339724384557787300 17768664926796219269 07738675105200547138 29412335348836544530 67695097880781875367 82433157196221920764 58138240149657208432 32304421681740196221 90966994914685081849

== See also ==
- Cunningham chain
- Szemerédi's theorem
- PrimeGrid
- Prime number theorem for arithmetic progressions
- Problems involving arithmetic progressions
