= Chebotarev density theorem =

Describes statistically the splitting of primes in a given Galois extension of Q

In mathematics, specifically in algebraic number theory, the Chebotarev density theorem, named after Nikolai Chebotarev, statistically describes the splitting of primes in a given Galois extension $K$ of the field $\mathbb{Q}$ of rational numbers. Generally speaking, a prime integer will factor into several ideal primes in the ring of algebraic integers of $K$. There are only finitely many patterns of splitting that may occur. Although the full description of the splitting of every prime $p$ in a general Galois extension is a major unsolved problem, the Chebotarev density theorem says that the frequency of the occurrence of a given pattern, for all primes $p$ less than a large integer $N$, tends to a certain limit as $N$ goes to infinity. It was proved by Chebotarev in his thesis in 1922.

A special case that is easier to state says that if $K$ is an algebraic number field which is a Galois extension of $\mathbb{Q}$ of degree $n$, then the prime numbers that completely split in $K$ have density $1/n$ among all primes. More generally, splitting behavior can be specified by assigning to (almost) every prime number an invariant, its Frobenius element, which is a representative of a well-defined conjugacy class in the Galois group $\operatorname{Gal}(K/\Q)$. In this case, the theorem says that the asymptotic distribution of these invariants is uniform over the group, so that a conjugacy class with $k$ elements occurs with frequency asymptotic to $k/n$.

== History and motivation ==
When Carl Friedrich Gauss first introduced the notion of complex integers $\Z[i]$, he observed that the ordinary prime numbers may factor further in this new set of integers. He distinguished three cases: if a prime $p$ is congruent to 1 mod 4, then it factors into a product of two distinct prime Gaussian integers, or "splits completely"; if $p$ is congruent to 3 mod 4, then it remains prime, or is "inert"; and if $p$ is 2 then it becomes a product of the square of the prime $(1+i)$ and the invertible Gaussian integer $-i$; we say that 2 "ramifies". For instance,

$5 = (1 + 2i)(1-2i)$ splits completely;
$3$ is inert;
$2 = -i(1+i)^2$ ramifies.

From this description, it appears that as one considers larger and larger primes, the frequency of a prime splitting completely approaches $50%$, and likewise for the primes that remain primes in $\Z[i]$. Dirichlet's theorem on arithmetic progressions demonstrates that this is indeed the case. Even though the prime numbers themselves appear rather erratically, splitting of the primes in the extension $\mathbb{Z}\subset \mathbb{Z}[i]$ follows a simple statistical law.

Similar statistical laws also hold for splitting of primes in the cyclotomic extensions, obtained from the field of rational numbers by adjoining a primitive root of unity of a given order. For example, the ordinary integer primes group into four classes, each with probability $25%$, according to their pattern of splitting in the ring of integers corresponding to the 8th roots of unity. In this case, the field extension has degree 4 and is abelian, with the Galois group isomorphic to the Klein four-group. It turned out that the Galois group of the extension plays a key role in the pattern of splitting of primes. Georg Frobenius established the framework for investigating this pattern and proved a special case of the theorem. The general statement was proved by Nikolai Grigoryevich Chebotaryov in 1922.

== Relation with Dirichlet's theorem ==
The Chebotarev density theorem may be viewed as a generalisation of Dirichlet's theorem on arithmetic progressions. A quantitative form of Dirichlet's theorem states that if $n \geq 2$ is an integer and $a$ is coprime to $n$, then the proportion of the primes $p$ congruent to $a$ mod $n$ is asymptotic to $1/\phi(n)$, where $\phi$ is the Euler totient function.

This is a special case of the Chebotarev density theorem for the $n$-th cyclotomic field $K$. Indeed, the Galois group of $K/\Q$ is abelian and can be canonically identified with the group of invertible residue classes mod $n$. The splitting invariant of a prime $p$ not dividing $n$ is simply its residue class because the number of distinct primes into which $p$ splits is $\phi(n)/m$, where $m$ is multiplicative order of $p$ modulo $n$; hence, by the Chebotarev density theorem, primes are asymptotically uniformly distributed among different residue classes coprime to $n$.

== Formulation ==
In their survey article, Lenstra & Stevenhagen (1996) give an earlier result of Frobenius in this area: let $P(t)$ be a monic integer polynomial and $K$ is a splitting field of $P(t)$; then $K/\Q$ is a Galois extension. It makes sense to factorise $P(t)$ modulo a prime number $p$. Its "splitting type" is the list of degrees of irreducible factors of $P(t)$ mod $p$; i.e. $P(t)$ factorizes in some fashion over the prime field $\mathbb{F}_p$. If $n$ is the degree of $P(t)$, then the splitting type is a partition $\Pi$ of $n$. Now each $g$ in $G = \operatorname{Gal}(K/\Q)$ is a permutation of the roots of $P(t)$ in $K$; in other words, by choosing an ordering of a root and its algebraic conjugates, $G$ is faithfully represented as a subgroup of the symmetric group $S_n$. We can write $g$ by means of its cycle representation, which gives a "cycle type" $c(g)$, again a partition of $n$.

The theorem of Frobenius states that for any given choice of $\Pi$ the primes $p$ for which the splitting type of $P(t)$ mod $p$ is $\Pi$ has a natural density $\delta$, with $\delta$ equal to the proportion of $g$ in $G$ that have cycle type $\Pi$.

The statement of the more general Chebotarev density theorem is in terms of the Frobenius element of a prime (ideal), which is in fact an associated conjugacy class $C$ of elements of the Galois group $G$. If we fix $C$ then the theorem says that, asymptotically, a proportion $|C|/|G|$ of primes have associated Frobenius element as $C$. When $G$ is abelian, the classes each have size 1. For the case of a non-abelian group of order 6 they have size 1, 2 and 3, and there are correspondingly (for example) $50%$ of primes $p$ that have an order 2 element as their Frobenius. Thus, these primes have residue degree 2, and so they split into exactly three prime ideals in a degree 6 extension of $\Q$ with it as Galois group.

== Statement ==
Let $L$ be a finite Galois extension of a number field $K$ with Galois group $G$. Let $X$ be a subset of $G$ that is stable under conjugation. The set of primes $v$ of $K$ that are unramified in $L$ and whose associated Frobenius conjugacy class $F_v$ is contained in $X$ has density $\#X/\#G$. The statement is valid when the density refers to either the natural density or the analytic density of the set of primes.

=== Effective version ===
The generalized Riemann hypothesis implies an effective version of the Chebotarev density theorem: if $L/K$ is a finite Galois extension with Galois group $G$, and $C$ a union of conjugacy classes of $G$, the number of unramified primes of $K$ of norm below $x$ with Frobenius conjugacy class in $C$ is

$$\frac{|C|}{|G|}\Bigl(\mathrm{Li}(x)+O\bigl(\sqrt x(n\log x+\log|\Delta|)\bigr)\Bigr),$$

where the constant implied in the big-O notation is absolute, $n$ is the degree of $L$ over $\Q$, and $\Delta$ its discriminant.

The effective form of the Chebotarev density theory becomes much weaker without the generalized Riemann hypothesis. Let $L/K$ be a finite Galois extension with Galois group $G$ and degree $d$, take $\rho$ to be a nontrivial irreducible representation of $G$ of degree $n$, and take $\mathfrak{f}(\rho)$ to be the Artin conductor of this representation. Suppose that, for $\rho_0$ a subrepresentation of $\rho \otimes \rho$ or $\rho \otimes \bar{\rho}$, $L(\rho_0, s)$ is entire; that is, the Artin conjecture is satisfied for all $\rho_0$. Take $\chi_{\rho}$ to be the character associated to $\rho$. Then there is an absolute positive $c$ such that, for $x \ge 2$,

$$\sum_{p \,\le\, x,\, p \,\not\mid\, \mathfrak{f}(\rho)} \chi_{\rho}(\text{Fr}_p) \log p = rx + O\biggl(\frac{x^{\beta}}{\beta} + x\exp\biggl(\frac{-c(dn)^{-4} \log x }{3\log \mathfrak{f}(\rho) + \sqrt{\log x}}\biggr) (dn \log (x\mathfrak{f}(\rho))\biggr),$$

where $r$ is $1$ if $\rho$ is trivial and is otherwise $0$, and where $\beta$ is an exceptional real zero of $L(\rho, s)$; if there is no such zero, the $x^{\beta}/\beta$ term can be ignored. The implicit constant of this expression is absolute.

=== Infinite extensions ===
The statement of the Chebotarev density theorem can be generalized to the case of an infinite Galois extension $L/K$ that is unramified outside a finite set $S$ of primes of $K$ (i.e. if there is a finite set $S$ of primes of $K$ such that any prime of $K$ not in $S$ is unramified in the extension $L/K$). In this case, the Galois group $G$ of $L/K$ is a profinite group equipped with the Krull topology. Since $G$ is compact in this topology, there is a unique Haar measure $\mu$ on $G$. For every prime $v$ of $K$ not in $S$ there is an associated Frobenius conjugacy class $F_v$. The Chebotarev density theorem in this situation can be stated as follows:

Let $X$ be a subset of $G$ that is stable under conjugation and whose boundary has Haar measure zero. Then, the set of primes $v$ of $K$ not in $S$ such that $F_v \subseteq X$ has density $\mu(X)/\mu(G).$

This reduces to the finite case when $L/K$ is finite (the Haar measure is then just the counting measure). A consequence of this version of the theorem is that the Frobenius elements of the unramified primes of $L$ are dense in $G$.

== Important consequences ==
The Chebotarev density theorem reduces the problem of classifying Galois extensions of a number field to that of describing the splitting of primes in extensions. Specifically, it implies that as a Galois extension $L/K$ is uniquely determined by the set of primes of $K$ that split completely in it. A related corollary is that if almost all prime ideals of $K$ split completely in $L$, then in fact $L = K$.

== See also ==
- Splitting of prime ideals in Galois extensions
- Grothendieck–Katz p-curvature conjecture
