= Dickson's conjecture =

Conjecture about prime numbers

In number theory, Dickson's conjecture is the statement that for a finite set of linear forms

$$a_1+b_1n,\; a_2+b_2n,\; \dots,\; a_k+b_kn$$

with each $b_i\geq 1$, there are infinitely many positive integers $n$ for which they are all prime, unless there is a congruence condition preventing this. The conjecture is named after Leonard Dickson, who first proposed it in 1903.

The case $k=1$ is Dirichlet's theorem. Two other special cases are well-known conjectures: that there are infinitely many twin primes ($n$ and $n+2$ are primes), and that there are infinitely many Sophie Germain primes ($n$ and $2n+1$ are primes).

== Generalized Dickson's conjecture ==
Given $n\geq 1$ polynomials with positive degrees and integer coefficients that each satisfy all three conditions in the Bunyakovsky conjecture, and if for any prime $p$ there is an integer $x$ such that the values of all $n$ polynomials at $x$ are not divisible by $p$, then there are infinitely many positive integers $x$ such that all values of these $n$ polynomials at $x$ are prime. For example, if the conjecture is true then there are infinitely many positive integers $x$ such that $x^2+1$, $3x-1$, and $x^2+x+41$ are all prime. When all the polynomials have degree 1, this is the original Dickson's conjecture. This generalization is equivalent to the generalized Bunyakovsky conjecture and Schinzel's hypothesis H.

== See also ==
- Green–Tao theorem
- First Hardy–Littlewood conjecture
- Prime constellation
- Primes in arithmetic progression
- Prime triplet
