= Green–Tao theorem =

Theorem about prime numbers

In number theory, the Green–Tao theorem, proven by Ben Green and Terence Tao in 2004, states that the sequence of prime numbers contains arbitrarily long arithmetic progressions. In other words, for every natural number $k$, there exist arithmetic progressions of primes with $k$ terms. The proof is an extension of Szemerédi's theorem. The problem can be traced back to investigations of Lagrange and Waring from around 1770.

== Statement ==
Let $\pi(N)$ denote the number of primes less than or equal to $N$. If $A$ is a subset of the prime numbers such that

$$\limsup_{N\rightarrow\infty} \frac{|A\cap [1,N]|}{\pi(N)}>0,$$

then for all positive integers $k$, the set $A$ contains infinitely many arithmetic progressions of length $k$. In particular, the entire set of prime numbers contains arbitrarily long arithmetic progressions.

In their later work on the generalized Hardy–Littlewood conjecture, Green and Tao stated and conditionally proved the asymptotic formula

$$(\mathfrak{S}_k + o(1))\frac{N^2}{(\log N)^k}$$

for the number of k tuples of primes $p_1 < p_2 < \dotsb < p_k \leq N$ in arithmetic progression. Here, $\mathfrak{S}_k$ is the constant

$$\mathfrak{S}_k := \frac{1}{2(k-1)}\left(\prod_{p \leq k}\frac{1}p\left(\frac{p}{p - 1}\right)^{\!k-1}\right)\!\left(\prod_{p > k}\left(1 - \frac{k-1}p\right)\!\left(\frac{p}{p - 1}\right)^{\!k-1}\right)\!.$$

The result was made unconditional by Green–Tao and Green–Tao–Ziegler.

== Overview of the proof ==
Green and Tao's proof has three main components:

1. Szemerédi's theorem, which asserts that subsets of the integers with positive upper density have arbitrarily long arithmetic progressions. It does not apply directly to the primes because the primes have density zero in the integers.
2. A transference principle that extends Szemerédi's theorem to subsets of the integers which are pseudorandom in a suitable sense. Such a result is now called a relative Szemerédi theorem.
3. A pseudorandom subset of the integers containing the primes as a dense subset. To construct this set, Green and Tao used ideas from Goldston, Pintz, and Yıldırım's work on prime gaps. Once the pseudorandomness of the set is established, the transference principle may be applied, completing the proof.

Numerous simplifications to the argument in the original paper have been found. Conlon, Fox & Zhao (2014) provide a modern exposition of the proof.

== Numerical work ==
The proof of the Green–Tao theorem does not show how to find the arithmetic progressions of primes; it merely proves they exist. There has been separate computational work to find large arithmetic progressions in the primes.

The Green–Tao paper states 'At the time of writing the longest known arithmetic progression of primes is of length 23, and was found in 2004 by Markus Frind, Paul Underwood, and Paul Jobling: 56,211,383,760,397 + 44,546,738,095,860 · k; k = 0, 1, . . ., 22.'.

On January 18, 2007, Jarosław Wróblewski found the first known case of 24 primes in arithmetic progression:

468,395,662,504,823 + 205,619 · 223,092,870 · n, for n = 0 to 23.

The constant 223,092,870 here is the product of the prime numbers up to 23, more compactly written 23# in primorial notation.

On May 17, 2008, Wróblewski and Raanan Chermoni found the first known case of 25 primes:

6,171,054,912,832,631 + 366,384 · 23# · n, for n = 0 to 24.

On April 12, 2010, Benoît Perichon with software by Wróblewski and Geoff Reynolds in a distributed PrimeGrid project found the first known case of 26 primes (sequence A204189 in the OEIS):

43,142,746,595,714,191 + 23,681,770 · 23# · n, for n = 0 to 25.

In September 2019 Rob Gahan and PrimeGrid found the first known case of 27 primes (sequence A327760 in the OEIS):

224,584,605,939,537,911 + 81,292,139 · 23# · n, for n = 0 to 26.

== Extensions and generalizations ==
Many of the extensions of Szemerédi's theorem hold for the primes as well.

Independently, Tao and Ziegler and Cook, Magyar, and Titichetrakun derived a multidimensional generalization of the Green–Tao theorem. The Tao–Ziegler proof was also simplified by Fox and Zhao.

In 2006, Tao and Ziegler extended the Green–Tao theorem to cover polynomial progressions. More precisely, given any integer-valued polynomials $P_1, \ldots, P_k$ in one indeterminate $m$ all with constant term 0, there are infinitely many integers $x, m$ such that $x + P_{1} (m), \ldots, x + P_{k} (m)$ are simultaneously prime. The special case when the polynomials are $m, 2m, \ldots, km$ implies the previous result that there arithmetic progressions of primes of length $k$.

Tao proved an analogue of the Green–Tao theorem for the Gaussian primes.

== See also ==
- Erdős conjecture on arithmetic progressions
- Dirichlet's theorem on arithmetic progressions
- Arithmetic combinatorics
