= Integer-valued polynomial =

Polynomial with integer values for integer inputs

In mathematics, an integer-valued polynomial (also known as a numerical polynomial) is a polynomial whose value is an integer for every integer input. Every polynomial with integer coefficients is integer-valued, but the converse is not true. For example, the polynomial

$$P(t) = \frac{t^2+t}{2} = \frac{t(t+1)}{2}$$

takes on integer values whenever $t$ is an integer. That is because one of $t$ and $t + 1$ must be an even number. (Note: The values this polynomial takes are precisely the triangular numbers.)

Integer-valued polynomials are objects of study in their own right in algebra, and frequently appear in algebraic topology.

== Classification ==
The class of integer-valued polynomials was described fully by George Pólya. Inside the polynomial ring $\Q[t]$ of polynomials with rational number coefficients, the subring of integer-valued polynomials is a free abelian group with basis the polynomials

$$P_k(t) = t(t-1)\cdots (t-k+1)/k!$$

for $k = 0,1,2, \dots$, i.e., the binomial coefficients. In other words, every integer-valued polynomial can be written as an integer linear combination of binomial coefficients in exactly one way. The proof is by the method of discrete Taylor series: binomial coefficients are integer-valued polynomials, and conversely, the discrete difference of an integer series is an integer series, so the discrete Taylor series of an integer series generated by a polynomial has integer coefficients (and is a finite series).

== Fixed prime divisors ==
Integer-valued polynomials may be used effectively to solve questions about fixed divisors of polynomials. For example, the polynomials $P$ with integer coefficients that always take on even number values are just those for which $P/2$ is integer-valued. Those in turn are the polynomials that may be expressed as a linear combination with even integer coefficients of the binomial coefficients.

In questions of prime number theory, such as Schinzel's hypothesis H and the Bateman–Horn conjecture, it is important to understand the case when $P$ has no fixed prime divisor (this has been called Bunyakovsky's property, after Viktor Bunyakovsky). By writing $P$ in terms of the binomial coefficients, we see the highest fixed prime divisor is also the highest prime common factor of the coefficients in such a representation. So Bunyakovsky's property is equivalent to coprime coefficients.

As an example, the pair of polynomials $n$ and $n^2 + 2$ violates this condition at $p = 3$: for every $n$ the product

$$n(n^2 + 2)$$

is divisible by 3, which follows from the representation

$$n(n^2 + 2) = 6 \binom{n}{3} + 6 \binom{n}{2} + 3 \binom{n}{1}$$

with respect to the binomial basis, where the highest common factor of the coefficients—hence the highest fixed divisor of $n(n^2+2)$—is 3.

== Other rings ==
Numerical polynomials can be defined over other rings and fields, in which case the integer-valued polynomials above are referred to as classical numerical polynomials.

== Applications ==
The K-theory of BU(n) is numerical (symmetric) polynomials.

The Hilbert polynomial of a polynomial ring in k + 1 variables is the numerical polynomial $\textstyle\binom{t+k}{k}$.

- Baker, Andrew; Clarke, Francis; Ray, Nigel; Schwartz, Lionel (1989). "On the Kummer congruences and the stable homotopy of BU". Transactions of the American Mathematical Society. 316 (2): 385–432. JSTOR 2001355. MR 0942424.
- Cahen, Paul-Jean; Chabert, Jean-Luc (1997). Integer-Valued Polynomials. Mathematical Surveys and Monographs. Vol. 48. Providence, RI: American Mathematical Society. ISBN 0-8218-0388-3. MR 1421321.
- Ekedahl, Torsten (2002). "On minimal models in integral homotopy theory". Homology, Homotopy and Applications. 4 (2): 191–218. arXiv:math/0107004. doi:10.4310/hha.2002.v4.n2.a9. MR 1918189. Zbl 1065.55003.
- Elliott, Jesse (2006). "Binomial rings, integer-valued polynomials, and λ-rings". Journal of Pure and Applied Algebra. 207 (1): 165–185. doi:10.1016/j.jpaa.2005.09.003. MR 2244389.
- Hubbuck, J. R. (1997). "Numerical forms". Journal of the London Mathematical Society. 2. 55 (1): 65–75. doi:10.1112/S0024610796004395. MR 1423286.
- Johnson, Keith (2014). "Stable homotopy theory, formal group laws, and integer-valued polynomials". In Fontana, Marco; Frisch, Sophie; Glaz, Sarah (eds.). Commutative Algebra: Recent Advances in Commutative Rings, Integer-Valued Polynomials, and Polynomial Functions. New York: Springer. pp. 213–223. doi:10.1007/978-1-4939-0925-4_12. ISBN 978-1-4939-0924-7.
- Pólya, George (1915). "Über ganzwertige ganze Funktionen". Rendiconti del Circolo Matematico di Palermo (in German). 40: 1–16. doi:10.1007/BF03014836. JFM 45.0655.02.
