= Viktor Bunyakovsky =

Russian mathematician

- Виктор Буняковский
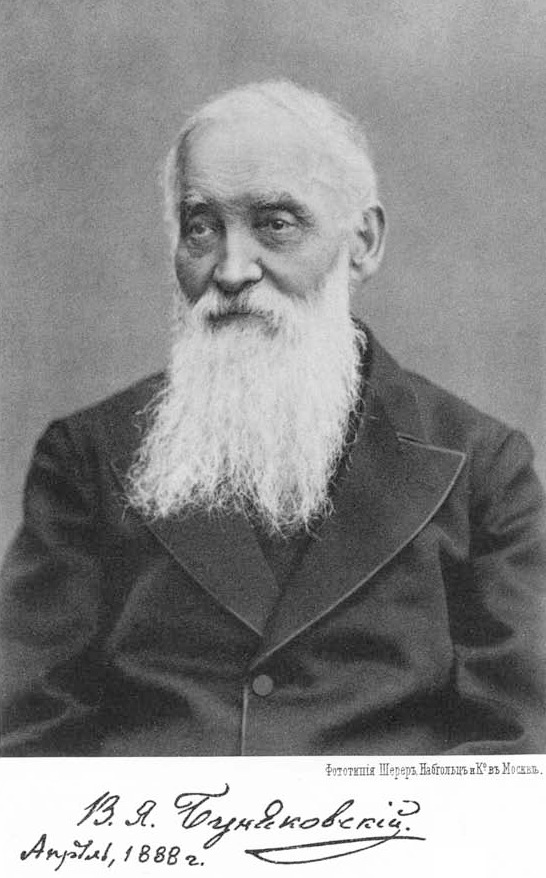
- Viktor Bunyakovsky in 1888
- Born: 16 December [O.S. 4 December] 1804; Bar, Podolia Governorate, Russian Empire
- Died: 12 December [O.S. 30 November] 1889; Saint Petersburg, Russian Empire
- Education: École Polytechnique
- Known for: Cauchy–Schwarz inequality, Bunyakovsky conjecture, theoretical mechanics, probability theory, number theory, condensed matter physics, finances
- Scientific career
- Fields: Mathematics, Physics, Finances
- Workplaces: St. Petersburg Academy of Sciences
- Thesis: Sur le mouvement de rotation dans un milieu résistant, d'un système de plans d'une épaisseur constante et d'un contour déterminé, autour d'un axe incliné, par rapport à l'horizon (1825)
- Doctoral advisor: Augustin Cauchy

Signature
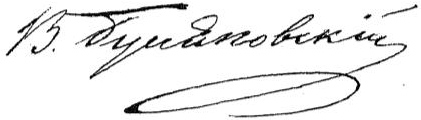

Viktor Yakovlevich Bunyakovsky (Russian: Виктор Яковлевич Буняковский; Ukrainian: Віктор Якович Буняковський, romanized: Viktor Yakovych Buniakovskyi; 16 December [O.S. 4 December] 1804 – 12 December [O.S. 30 November] 1889) was a Russian mathematician, member and later vice president of the Petersburg Academy of Sciences.

Bunyakovsky was a mathematician, noted for his work in theoretical mechanics and number theory (see: Bunyakovsky conjecture), and is credited with an early discovery of the Cauchy–Schwarz inequality, proving it for the infinite dimensional case as well as for definite integrals of real-valued functions in 1859, many years prior to Hermann Schwarz's works on the subject.

== Biography ==
Viktor Yakovlevich Bunyakovsky was born in Bar, Podolia Governorate, Russian Empire (now Vinnytsia Oblast, Ukraine) in 1804. Bunyakovsky was a son of Colonel Yakov Vasilievich Bunyakovsky of a cavalry regiment, who was killed in Finland in 1809.

== Education ==
Bunyakovsky obtained his initial mathematical education at the home of his father's friend, Count Alexander Tormasov, in St. Petersburg. In 1820, he traveled with the count's son to a university in Coburg and subsequently to the Sorbonne in Paris to study mathematics. At the Sorbonne, Bunyakovsky had opportunity to attend lectures from Laplace and Poisson. He focused his study and research on mathematics and physics.

In 1824, Bunyakovsky received his bachelor's degree from the Sorbonne. Continuing his research, he wrote three doctoral dissertations under Cauchy's supervision by the spring of 1825:

1. The rotary motion in a resistant medium of a set of plates of constant thickness and defined contour around an axis inclined with respect to the horizon;
2. The determination of the radius vector in elliptical motion of planets; and
3. The propagation of heat in solids.

He successfully completed his dissertation on theoretical physics, theoretical mechanics and mathematical physics, and obtained his doctorate under Cauchy's supervision.

== Scientific and pedagogical work ==
After the seven years abroad, Bunyakovsky returned to St. Petersburg in 1826 and took up teaching and research, which he pursued for much of his life. In addition to the university courses in analytical mathematics, differential equations, and probability theory, he was also active in preparing syllabi and teaching manuals for Russian schools and military academies.

He lectured on mathematics and mechanics at the First Cadet Corps (later the Naval Academy) from 1826 to 1831 and at the Communications Institute in St. Petersburg.

From 1828 to 1864, Bunyakovsky was attached to the officer classes at the Naval Academy in St. Petersburg.

From 1846 to 1880, Bunyakovsky was a professor at St. Petersburg University in St. Petersburg, Russia.

In 1859, Bunyakovsky taught mathematics at St. Petersburg State Railways University, named after Alexander I in St. Petersburg, Russia.

Alongside his teaching responsibilities, Bunyakovsky made significant scientific contributions in number theory and probability theory. His other scientific interests included: mathematical physics, condensed matter physics, mathematical analysis, differential equations, actuarial mathematics, and mathematics education with a focus on mathematical terminology.

He worked on theoretical mechanics and number theory (see: Bunyakovsky conjecture). He is credited with an early discovery of the Cauchy–Schwarz inequality, proving it for the infinite dimensional case in 1859, many years prior to Hermann Schwarz's research on the subject.

Bunyakovsky is an author of Foundations of the mathematical theory of probability (1846). Bunyakovsky published around 150 research papers.

== St. Petersburg Academy of Sciences ==
Bunyakovsky became a member of the precursor organization to the Russian Academy of Sciences. He was named an adjunct in mathematics (7 May 1828), an extraordinary academician (24 March 1830), and an ordinary academician at the physics and mathematics division (8 January 1841).

Bunyakovsky was elected to the post of the Vice President of the Russian Academy of Sciences on 8 April 1864 (in fact since 10 August 1863 г.). Bunyakovsky was the Vice President of the St. Petersburg Academy of Sciences for 25 years (8 April 1864 – 26 September 1889).

In 1875, the St. Petersburg Academy of Sciences issued a medal and established a prize, bearing Viktor Yakovlevich Bunyakovsky's name, for his outstanding mathematical research.

== Scientific contributions ==
Bunyakovsky wrote around 150 research works and a number of books.

Bunyakovsky published his first volume: Lexicon of fundamental and applied mathematics, which was written until letter "D" in Russia in 1839. After Bunyakovsky's death, the manuscripts with other volumes: E, F, G, H, I, J, K, L were found, containing a note by Bunyakovsky's hand: "Do not print, but pass to the Russian Academy of Sciences archive for the researchers, who will continue my Lexicon." The hand-written manuscripts are preserved at the Department of Manuscripts, Library, Russian Academy of Sciences.

Foundations of mathematical theory of probability, by Bunyakovsky was published by Imperial Academy of Sciences of St. Petersburg in St. Petersburg in 1846. Bunyakovsky became a world famous scientist after this publication.

Bunyakovsky wrote a research article titled: "On possibility of introduction of certain measures of trust to results of some sciences and statistics mainly", which was published in Sovremennik in Russia in 1848.

Bunyakovsky published his monograph: "The parallel lines" in which he provided the scientific evidences to the problems in the parallel lines theory in Russia in 1853.

Bunyakovsky wrote a research article titled: "Biological researches and their application to man's population in Russia", which was published in "Zapiski Academii Nauk" in Russia in 1873 or 1874.

Bunyakovsky printed a research article titled: "On the probability of number of divisions of Russian army in 1883–1885", which was published in Zapiski Academii Nauk in Russia in 1885.

Bunyakovsky developed a number of practical applications as far as the probability theory is concerned, publishing his research articles in the Russian magazines Sovremennik and Zhurnal Ministerstava Narodnogo Prosvesheniya.

Bunyakovsky made a significant scientific contribution to the problem of the naval department pension fund creation, publishing his research articles in Morskoi Sbornik magazine in 1858.

Bunyakovsky formulated an empirical law of deaths in 1869, making it possible to solve the problems on the calculation of both capital insurance and life-time incomes in finances.

== Legacy ==
A street in Bar, Ukraine, is named after Bunyakovsky.

The Bunyakovsky International Conference honoring Bunyakovsky's scientific achievements was organized in 2004 in Kyiv, Ukraine.
