= Bateman–Horn conjecture =

Conjecture in number theory

In number theory, the Bateman–Horn conjecture is a statement concerning the frequency of prime numbers among the values of a system of polynomials, named after mathematicians Paul T. Bateman and Roger A. Horn who proposed it in 1962. It provides a vast generalization of such conjectures as the Hardy–Littlewood conjecture on the density of twin primes or their conjecture on primes of the form $n^2+1$. It is also a strengthening of Schinzel's hypothesis H.

== Definition ==
The Bateman–Horn conjecture provides a conjectured density for the positive integers at which a given set of polynomials all have prime values. For a set of $m$ distinct irreducible polynomials $f_1,\dots,f_m$ with integer coefficients, a necessary condition for the polynomials to simultaneously generate prime values infinitely often is that they satisfy Bunyakovsky's property; namely, that there does not exist a prime number $p$ that divides their product $f(n)$ for every positive integer $n$. For, if there were such a prime $p$, having all values of the polynomials simultaneously prime for a given $n$ would imply that at least one of them must be equal to $p$, which can only happen for finitely many values of $n$ or there would be a polynomial with infinitely many roots, whereas the conjecture is how to give conditions where the values are simultaneously prime for infinitely many $n$.

An integer $n$ is prime-generating for the given system of polynomials if every polynomial $f_i(n)$ produces a prime number when given $n$ as its argument. If $P(x)$ is the number of prime-generating integers among the positive integers less than $x$, then the Bateman–Horn conjecture states that

$$P(x) \sim \frac{C}{D} \int_2^x \!\frac{dt}{(\log t)^m},\,$$

where $D$ is the product of the degrees of the polynomials and $C$ is the product over primes $p$:

$$C = \prod_p \frac{1-N(p)/p}{(1-1/p)^m},$$

with $N(p)$ the number of solutions to

$$f(n) \equiv 0 \!\!\pmod p.$$

Bunyakovsky's property implies $N(p) < p$ for all primes $p$, so each factor in the infinite product $C$ is positive. Intuitively one then naturally expects that the constant $C$ is itself positive, and with some work this can be proved. (Work is needed since some infinite products of positive numbers equal zero.)

== Negative numbers ==
As stated above, the conjecture is not true: the single polynomial $f_1(x)=-x$ produces only negative numbers when given a positive argument, so the fraction of prime numbers among its values is always zero. There are two equally valid ways of refining the conjecture to avoid this difficulty:

- One may require all the polynomials to have positive leading coefficients, so that only a constant number of their values can be negative.
- Alternatively, one may allow negative leading coefficients but count a negative number as being prime when its absolute value is prime.

It is reasonable to allow negative numbers to count as primes as a step towards formulating more general conjectures that apply to other systems of numbers than the integers, but at the same time it is easy to just negate the polynomials if necessary to reduce to the case where the leading coefficients are positive.

== Examples ==
If the system of polynomials consists of the single polynomial $f_1(x)=x$, then the values $n$ for which $f_1(n)$ is prime are themselves the prime numbers, and the conjecture becomes a restatement of the prime number theorem.

If the system of polynomials consists of the two polynomials $f_1(x)=x$ and $f_2(x)=x+2$, then the values of $n$ for which both $f_1(n)$ and $f_2(n)$ are prime are just the smaller of the two primes in every pair of twin primes. In this case, the Bateman–Horn conjecture reduces to the Hardy–Littlewood conjecture on the density of twin primes, according to which the number of twin prime pairs less than $x$ is

$$\pi_2(x) \sim 2  \prod_{p\ge 3} \frac{p(p-2)}{(p-1)^2}\frac{x}{(\log x)^2 } \approx 1.32 \frac {x}{(\log x)^2}.$$

== Analogue for polynomials over a finite field ==
When the integers are replaced by the polynomial ring $F[u]$ for a finite field $F$, one can ask how often a finite set of polynomials $f_i(x)$ in $F[u][x]$ simultaneously takes irreducible values in $F[u]$ when we substitute for $x$ elements of $F[u]$. Well-known analogies between integers and $F[u]$ suggest an analogue of the Bateman–Horn conjecture over $F[u]$, but this is wrong: for example, data suggest that the polynomial

$$x^3 + u\,$$

in $F_3[u][x]$ takes (asymptotically) the expected number of irreducible values when $x$ runs over polynomials in $F_3[u]$ of odd degree, but it appears to take (asymptotically) twice as many irreducible values as expected when $x$ runs over polynomials of degree that is 2 mod 4, while it (provably) takes no irreducible values at all when $x$ runs over nonconstant polynomials with degree that is a multiple of 4. An analogue of the Bateman–Horn conjecture over $F[u]$ which fits numerical data uses an additional factor in the asymptotics which depends on the value of $d$ mod 4, where $d$ is the degree of the polynomials in $F[u]$ over which $x$ is sampled.
