= Siva (disambiguation) =

Siva is a Hindu god.

Siva may also refer to:

== Film and television ==
- Siva (director), Indian cinematographer and director
- Siva (1989 Tamil film), a film starring Rajinikanth as the title character
- Siva (1989 Telugu film), an action film

== Music and dance ==
- Siva (soundtrack), soundtrack album by Ilaiyaraaja for the 1989 Telugu film
- "Siva" (song), a song by the Smashing Pumpkins
- Siva Samoa, a type of Samoan dance often performed at weddings

== Companies ==
- Siva Motor Car Company, a British automobile manufacturer active in the 1970s
- Siva Power, a Californian solar power startup founded in 2006

== Science ==
- Siva (protein), a pro-apoptotic signaling protein
- Siva (rebreather), an oxygen rebreather
- Siva, the monotypic bird genus of the blue-winged minla
- SIVA vaccines, enable Segregation of Infected from Vaccinated Animals (SIVA) by using a different epitope from the wild form of the microbe

== People with the name ==
- Peyton Siva (born 1990), American basketball player
- Siva Chinnatamby (c.1921/3 – 2000), Sri Lankan obstetrician
- Siva Kaneswaran (born 1988), Irish singer, member of the boy band The Wanted
- Ambalavaner Sivanandan, commonly known as Siva (1923–2018), Sri Lankan writer and activist

== Other uses ==
- Siva (river), a tributary of the Kama in Russia
- Siva (rural locality), a list of rural localities in Russia
- 1170 Siva, an asteroid named after the Hindu god
- Shanghai Institute of Visual Art, a public university in China
- Simplified individual voluntary arrangement, a pending UK insolvency process
- SIVA or the Industrial Development Corporation of Norway
- Živa (goddess), a Slavic goddess of fertility also known as Šiva
- SIVA, the main threat in Destiny: Rise of Iron, an expansion pack for the Destiny video game

== See also ==
- Ezhava Siva, a caste of Kerala, India
- Sivan (disambiguation)
- Shiva (disambiguation)
- Shiv (disambiguation)
- Siwa (disambiguation)
- Siv (disambiguation)
- Seva (disambiguation)
- Sieve (disambiguation)
- Živa (disambiguation)
- Shivering
- Yeshiva, Jewish religious schools
