= Siwa =

Siwa may refer to:

== Places ==
- Siwa Oasis, an oasis in Egypt
- Siwa, Panchthar, a Village Development Committee in Nepal
- 140 Siwa, a main-belt asteroid

== People and characters ==
- Siwa or Shiva, a Hindu god
- Siwa or Ziva, a Slavic goddess of fertility
- JoJo Siwa (born 2003), American dancer, singer, actress, and YouTube personality
- Siwa Prommas (born 1985), Thai soccer player

== Other uses ==
- Siwa (horn), an East African side-blown ceremonial horn
- Siwa (spider), a genus in the family Araneidae
- Siwa language, a Berber language of Egypt
- Siwa culture, a Bronze Age culture in Gansu, China
- Siwa (beer), a type of Ethiopian beer
- Sign in with Apple (SIWA), a single sign-on provider operated by Apple
- Scottish Inland Waterways Association
- Siwa, a defunct brand of convenience stores in Finland acquired by Kesko

== See also ==
- Shiwa (disambiguation)
- Siva (disambiguation)
- Shiva (disambiguation)
- SIW (disambiguation)
