= Wheel factorization =

Algorithm for generating numbers coprime with first few primes

Wheel factorization with n = 2 × 3 × 5 = 30. No primes will occur in the yellow areas.

Wheel factorization is a method for generating a sequence of natural numbers by repeated additions, as determined by a number of the first few primes, so that the generated numbers are coprime with these primes, by construction.

== Description ==
For a chosen number n (usually no larger than 4 or 5), the first n primes determine the specific way to generate a sequence of natural numbers which are all known in advance to be coprime with these primes; that is, they are all known to not be multiples of any of these primes. This method can thus be used for an improvement of the trial division method for integer factorization, as none of the generated numbers need be tested in trial divisions by those small primes.

The trial division method consists of dividing the number to be factorized by the integers in increasing order (2, 3, 4, 5, ...) successively. A common improvement consists of testing only by primes, i.e. by 2, 3, 5, 7, 11, …. With the wheel factorization, one starts from a small list of numbers, called the basis (usually the first few primes); then, one generates the list, called the wheel, of the integers that are coprime with all the numbers in the basis.

Then, for the numbers generated by "rolling the wheel", one needs to only consider the primes not in the basis as their possible factors. It is as if these generated numbers have already been tested, and found to not be divisible by any of the primes in the basis. It is an optimization because all these operations become redundant, and are spared from being performed at all.

When used in finding primes, or sieving in general, this method reduces the amount of candidate numbers to be considered as possible primes. With the basis {2, 3}, the reduction is to 1/3 < 34% of all the numbers. This means that fully 2/3 of all the candidate numbers are skipped over automatically. Larger bases reduce this proportion even further; for example, with basis {2, 3, 5} to 8/30 < 27%, and with basis {2, 3, 5, 7} to 48/210 < 23%.

The bigger the wheel, the larger the computational resources involved and the smaller the additional improvements, leading to quickly diminishing returns.

== Introduction ==
Natural numbers from 1 and up are enumerated by repeated addition of 1:

1, 2, 3, 4, 5, ...

Considered by spans of two numbers each, they are enumerated by repeated additions of 2:

1, 2 ; 3, 4 ; 5, 6 ; ...

Every second number thus generated will be even. Thus odds are generated by the repeated additions of 2:

1 ; 3 ; 5 ; 7 ; ...

Considered by spans of three numbers each, they are enumerated by repeated additions of 2 × 3 = 6:

1, 3, 5 ; 7, 9, 11 ; ...

Every second number in these triplets will be a multiple of 3, because numbers of the form 3 + 6k are all odd multiples of 3. Thus all the numbers coprime with the first two primes (2 and 3) will be generated by repeated additions of 6, starting from {1, 5}:

1, 5 ; 7, 11 ; 13, 17 ; ...

The same sequence can be generated by repeated additions of 2 × 3 × 5 = 30, turning each five consecutive spans, of two numbers each, into one joined span of ten numbers:

1, 5, 7, 11, 13, 17, 19, 23, 25, 29 ; 31, 35, 37, ...

Out of each ten of these 6-coprime numbers, two are multiples of 5, thus the remaining eight will be 30-coprime:

1, 7, 11, 13, 17, 19, 23, 29 ; 31, 37, 41, 43, 47, 49, ...

This is naturally generalized.

The above showcases first three wheels:

- {1} (containing 1 = 2 − 1 number) with the "circumference" of 2 for generating the sequence of 2-coprimes by repeated addition of 2;
- {1, 5} (containing 2 = (2 − 1) × (3 − 1) numbers) with the "circumference" of 2 × 3 = 6, for generating the sequence of 6-coprime numbers by repeated additions of 6;
- {1, 7, 11, 13, 17, 19, 23, 29} (containing 8 = (2−1) × (3−1) × (5−1) numbers) with the "circumference" of 2 × 3 × 5 = 30, for generating the sequence of 30-coprime numbers by repeated additions of 30; etc.

Another representation of these wheels is by turning a wheel's numbers, as seen above, into a circular list of the differences between the consecutive numbers, and then generating the sequence starting from 1 by repeatedly adding these increments one after another to the last generated number, indefinitely. This is the closest it comes to the rolling the wheel metaphor. For instance, this turns {1, 7, 11, 13, 17, 19, 23, 29, 31} into {6, 4, 2, 4, 2, 4, 6, 2}, and then the sequence is generated as

n=1; n+6=7; n+4=11; n+2=13; n+4=17; n+2=19; n+4=23; n+6=29; n+2=31; n+6=37; n+4=41; n+2=43; etc.

== A typical example ==
With a given basis of the first 3 prime numbers {2, 3, 5}, the "first turn" of the wheel consists of:

7, 11, 13, 17, 19, 23, 29, 31.

The second turn is obtained by adding 30, the product of the basis, to the numbers in the first turn. The third turn is obtained by adding 30 to the second turn, and so on.

For implementing the method, one may remark that the increments between two consecutive elements of the wheel, that is

inc = [4, 2, 4, 2, 4, 6, 2, 6],

remain the same after each turn.

The suggested implementation that follows uses an auxiliary function div(n,k), which tests whether n is evenly divisible by k, and returns true in this case and false otherwise. In this implementation, the number to be factorized is n, and the program returns the smallest divisor of n – returning n itself if it is prime.

if div(n, 2) = true then return 2
if div(n, 3) = true then return 3
if div(n, 5) = true then return 5
k := 7; i := 0
while k * k ≤ n do
    if div(n, k) = true, then return k
    k := k + inc[i]
    if i < 7 then i := i + 1 else i := 0
return n

For getting the complete factorization of an integer, the computation may be continued without restarting the wheel at the beginning. This leads to the following program for a complete factorization, where the function add adds its first argument at the end of the second argument, which must be a list.

factors := [ ]
while div(n, 2) = true do
    factors := add(2, factors)
    n := n / 2
while div(n, 3) = true do
    factors := add(3, factors)
    n := n / 3
while div(n, 5) = true do
    factors := add(5, factors)
    n := n / 5
k := 7; i := 0
while k * k ≤ n do
    if div(n, k) = true then 
        add(k, factors)
        n := n / k
    else
        k := k + inc[i]
        if i < 7 then i := i + 1 else i := 0
if n > 1 then add(n, factors)
return factors

== Another presentation ==
Wheel factorization is used for generating lists of mostly prime numbers from a simple mathematical formula and a much smaller list of the first prime numbers. These lists may then be used in trial division or sieves. Because not all the numbers in these lists are prime, doing so introduces inefficient redundant operations. However, the generators themselves require very little memory compared to keeping a pure list of prime numbers. The small list of initial prime numbers constitute complete parameters for the algorithm to generate the remainder of the list. These generators are referred to as wheels. While each wheel may generate an infinite list of numbers, past a certain point, the numbers cease to be mostly prime.

The method may further be applied recursively as a prime number wheel sieve to generate more accurate wheels. Much definitive work on wheel factorization, sieves using wheel factorization, and wheel sieve, was done by Paul Pritchard in formulating a series of different algorithms. To visualize the use of a factorization wheel, one may start by writing the natural numbers around circles as shown in the adjacent diagram. The number of spokes is chosen such that prime numbers will have a tendency to accumulate in a minority of the spokes.

== Sample graphical procedure ==
1. Find the first few prime numbers to form the basis of the factorization wheel. They are known or perhaps determined from previous applications of smaller factorization wheels or by quickly finding them using the Sieve of Eratosthenes.
2. Multiply the base prime numbers together to give the result n, which is the circumference of the factorization wheel.
3. Write the numbers 1 to n in a circle. This will be the inner-most circle representing one rotation of the wheel.
4. From the numbers 1 to n in the innermost circle, strike off all multiples of the base primes from step one as applied in step 2. This composite number elimination can be accomplished either by use of a sieve such as the Sieve of Eratosthenes or as the result of applications of smaller factorization wheels.
5. Taking x to be the number of circles written so far, continue to write xn + 1 to xn + n in concentric circles around the inner-most circle, such that xn + 1 is in the same position as (x − 1)n + 1.
6. Repeat step 5 until the largest rotation circle spans the largest number to be tested for primality.
7. Strike off the number 1.
8. Strike off the spokes of the prime numbers as found in step 1 and applied in step 2 in all outer circles without striking off the prime numbers in the inner-most circle (in circle 1).
9. Strike off the spokes of all multiples of prime numbers struck from the inner circle 1 in step 4 in the same way as striking off the spokes of the base primes in step 8.
10. The remaining numbers in the wheel are mostly prime numbers (they are collectively called "relatively" prime). Use other methods such as the Sieve of Eratosthenes or further application of larger factorization wheels to remove the remaining non-primes.

== Example ==
Wheel factorization with n = 2 × 3 = 6

1. Find the first 2 prime numbers: 2 and 3.
2. n = 2 × 3 = 6
3.   1  2  3  4  5  6
4. strike off factors of 2 and 3 which are 4 and 6 as factors of 2; 6 as the only factor of 3 is already stricken:
    1  2  3  4  5  6
5. x = 1.
  xn + 1 = 1 ⋅ 6 + 1 = 7.
  (x + 1)n = (1 + 1) · 6 = 12.
  Write 7 to 12 with 7 aligned with 1.
    1  2  3  4  5  6
  7  8  9 10 11 12
6. x = 2.
  xn + 1 = 2 ⋅ 6 + 1 = 13.
  (x + 1)n = (2 + 1) · 6 = 18.
  Write 13 to 18.
  Repeat for the next few lines.
    1  2  3  4  5  6
  7  8  9 10 11 12
 13 14 15 16 17 18
 19 20 21 22 23 24
 25 26 27 28 29 30
7. Sieving
    1  2  3  4  5  6
  7  8  9 10 11 12
 13 14 15 16 17 18
 19 20 21 22 23 24
 25 26 27 28 29 30
8. Sieving
    1  2  3  4  5  6
  7  8  9 10 11 12
 13 14 15 16 17 18
 19 20 21 22 23 24
 25 26 27 28 29 30
9. The resulting list contains a non-prime number of 25 which is 5^{2}. Use other methods such as a sieve to eliminate it to arrive at
   2 3 5 7 11 13 17 19 23 29

Note that by using exactly the next prime number of 5 wheel cycles and eliminating the multiple(s) of that prime (and only that prime) from the resulting list, we have obtained the base wheel as per step 4 for a factorization wheel with base primes of 2, 3, and 5; this is one wheel in advance of the previous {2,3} factorization wheel. One could then follow the steps to step 10 using the next succeeding prime of 7 cycles and only eliminating the multiples of 7 from the resulting list in step 10 (leaving some "relative" primes in this case and all successive cases – i.e. some not true fully qualified primes), to get the next further advanced wheel, recursively repeating the steps as necessary to get successively larger wheels.

== Analysis and computer implementation ==
Formally, the method makes use of the following insights: first, that the set of base primes unioned with its (infinite) set of coprimes is a superset of the primes; second, that the infinite set of coprimes can be enumerated easily from the coprimes to the base set between 2 and the base set product. (Note that 1 requires special handling.)

As seen in the example above, the result of repeated applications of the above recursive procedure from steps 4 through 10 can be a wheel list which spans any desired sieving range (to which it can be truncated) and the resulting list then includes only the multiples of primes higher than one past the last-used base primes.

Once a wheel spans the desired upper limit of the sieving range, one can stop generating further wheels and use the information in that wheel to cull the remaining composite numbers from that last wheel list using a Sieve-of-Eratosthenes-type technique but using the gap pattern inherent to the wheel to avoid redundant culls; some optimizations may be able to be made based on the fact that (will be proven in the next section) there will be no repeat culling of any composite number: each remaining composite will be culled exactly once. Alternatively, one can continue to generate truncated wheel lists using primes up to the square root of the desired sieve range, in which case all remaining number representations in the wheel will be prime; however, although this method is as efficient as to never cull composite numbers more than once, it loses much time external to the normally considered culling operations in processing the successive wheel sweeps so as to take much longer. The elimination of composite numbers by a factorization wheel is based on the following: Given a number k > n, we know that k is not prime if k mod n and n are not relatively prime. From that, the fraction of numbers that the wheel sieve eliminates can be determined (although not all need be physically struck off; many can be culled automatically in the operations of copying of lesser wheels to greater wheels) as 1 − φ(n) / n, which is also the efficiency of the sieve.

It is known that

$$\lim\inf\frac{\varphi(n)}{n}\log\log n = e^{-\gamma}\sim 0.56145948,$$

where γ is Euler's constant. Thus φ(n) / n goes to zero slowly as n increases to infinity, and it can be seen that this efficiency rises very slowly to 100% for infinitely large n. From the properties of φ, it can easily be seen that the most efficient sieve smaller than x is the one where n = p_{1}p_{2}…p_{i} < x and np_{i+1} ≥ x (that is, wheel generation can stop when the last wheel passes or has a sufficient circumference to include the highest number in the sieving range).

To be of maximum use on a computer, we want the numbers that are smaller than n and relatively prime to it as a set. Using a few observations, the set can easily be generated:

1. Start with S_{1} = {1}, which is the set for n = 1 with 2 as the first prime. This initial set means that all numbers starting at two up are included as "relative" primes as the circumference of the wheel is 1.
2. The following sets are S_{2} = {1}, which means that it starts at 3 for all odd numbers with the factors of 2 eliminated (circumference of 2), S_{6} = {1,5} has the factors of 2 and 3 eliminated (circumference of 6) as for the initial base wheel in the example above, and so on.
3. Let S_{n} + k be the set where k has been added to each element of S_{n}.
4. Then S_{np_{i+1}} = F_{p_{i+1}}[S_{n} ∪ S_{n} + n ∪ S_{n} + 2n ∪ … ∪ S_{n} + n(p_{i+1} − 1)], where F_{x} represents the operation of removing all multiples of x.
5. 1 and p_{i+1} will be the two smallest of S_{n} when n > 2, removing the need to compute prime numbers separately, although the algorithm does need to keep a record of all eliminated base primes which are no longer included in the succeeding sets.
6. All sets where the circumference n > 2 are symmetrical around n / 2, reducing storage requirements. The following algorithm does not use this fact, but it is based on the fact that the gaps between successive numbers in each set are symmetrical around the halfway point.

== See also ==
- Sieve of Sundaram
- Sieve of Atkin
- Sieve of Pritchard
- Sieve theory
