= Sift (disambiguation) =

Sift refers to the straining action of a sifter or sieve.

Sift or SIFT may also refer to:

- Scale-invariant feature transform, an algorithm in computer vision to detect and describe local features in images
- Selected-ion flow tube, a technique used for mass spectrometry
- Shanghai Institute of Foreign Trade, a public university in Shanghai, China
- Stop, Investigate, Find, Trace (SIFT), a heuristic for verifying the accuracy of media claims
- Summary of Information on Film and Television, a database of the British Film Institute National Library
- Società Italiana Ferrovie e Tramvie, the Italian Railways and Tramways Company
- Summer Institute for Future Teachers, a residential summer program at Eastern Connecticut State University
- The Sift, a fictional dimension from Minecraft that makes its debut in its spin-off Minecraft Dungeons II

== See also ==
- Sieve (disambiguation), for the word "sift"
- Sifted (formerly VeriShip), an American logistics company
- Sift (company), an American software company
