= Shiwa =

Shiwa may refer to:

- Shiwa, Iran, a village in Razavi Khorasan Province
- Shiwa, Iwate, Japan, a town
- Shiwa District, Iwate
- Shiwe language, also known as "Shiwa"

== See also ==
- Shiwa Ngandu, a grand English-style country house and estate in the Northern Province of Zambia
- Shiwa 2000, a Suomisoundi-style psychedelic trance group from Finland
- Siwa (disambiguation)
- Shiba (disambiguation)
- Shiva (disambiguation)
