= Shiv (disambiguation) =

A shiv is an improvised pointed or bladed weapon.

Shiv may also refer to:

== Arts, entertainment, and media ==
- Shiv Roy, a character in the drama series Succession
- Shiv, a fictional location in Magic: The Gathering, see Dominaria
- Shiv, a villain in the animated series Static Shock
- Shiv, a fictional villain from DC Comics

== Other uses ==
- Simian human immunodeficiency virus (SHIV)
- Shiv, a shortened form of the name Siobhan
- Shiv, a local Marathi name for Sion, Mumbai
- Shiva, a Hindu deity also known as Shiv
- Shivnarine Chanderpaul, a West Indies cricketer nicknamed Shiv

== See also ==
- Shives, the woody waste material from flax, hemp, and linseed plants
- Shive (disambiguation)
- Shiva (disambiguation)
- Siva (disambiguation)
- Sivan (disambiguation)
