= Cib =

Cib or CIB may refer to:

== Places ==
- Cib, a village in Almașu Mare Commune, Alba County, Romania
- Čib, today Čelarevo, a village in the Bačka Palanka Municipality, South Bačka District, Serbia
- Cib (river) in Alba and Hunedoara Counties, Romania
- Palo Verde Airport (AFAC airport code CIB), San Bruno, Baja California Sur, Mexico

== Groups, organizations ==
- Campaign for an Independent Britain, a cross-party Eurosceptic campaign group
- Cardiff Institute for the Blind, Wales
- Catholic Irish Brigade, a brigade of the British Army raised during the French Revolutionary Wars
- Companies Investigation Branch, part of the UK's Department for Business, Enterprise and Regulatory Reform
- Condor Berlin GmbH (ICAO airline code CIB), a German airline

=== Banks ===
- Cairo International Bank, a commercial bank in Uganda
- Canada Infrastructure Bank
- CIB, the NYSE symbol CIB for Bancolombia
- CIB Bank, a commercial bank in Hungary
- Commercial International Bank, a bank in Egypt
- Corporate and Institutional Banking, an arm of BNP Paribas

=== Police ===
- Central Investigation Bureau, the national investigation agency of Nepal which is run under Nepal Police
- Commonwealth Investigation Branch, a former federal law enforcement organisation in Australia
- Complaints Investigation Bureau, a defunct unit of London's Metropolitan Police, replaced by the Directorate of Professional Standards
- Criminal Investigation Branch, one of the main branches of the New Zealand Police
- Criminal Investigation Bureau, an agency of Taiwan Police

== Other uses ==
- Canada Investment Bond. a type of Canada Savings Bond
- Common data link (CDL) Interface Box
- Complete in Box, a form of video game packaging.
- Combat Infantryman Badge, a United States Army military award
- Controlled image base, unclassified digital imagery produced by the National Geospatial Intelligence Agency
- Cosmic infrared background, a mysterious infrared light coming from outer space
- USCG Cutter Information Book
- Fon language (ISO 639 language code cib), or Dahomean, a West African language

== See also ==
- CI&B (Coney Island and Brooklyn Railroad)
- Chib (disambiguation)
