= Shiwe =

Shiwe may refer to

- Shiwe language of central Gabon
- Shiwe Nogwanya (born 1994), South African football striker

== See also ==
- Shive (disambiguation)
