= Chibs =

Chibs may refer to:

- Chibs Telford, a fictional character in the Sons of Anarchy TV series

== See also ==
- Chib (disambiguation)
