= Vaddadi Papaiah =

Painter and illustrator for Telugu magazines

VADDADI PAPAIAH
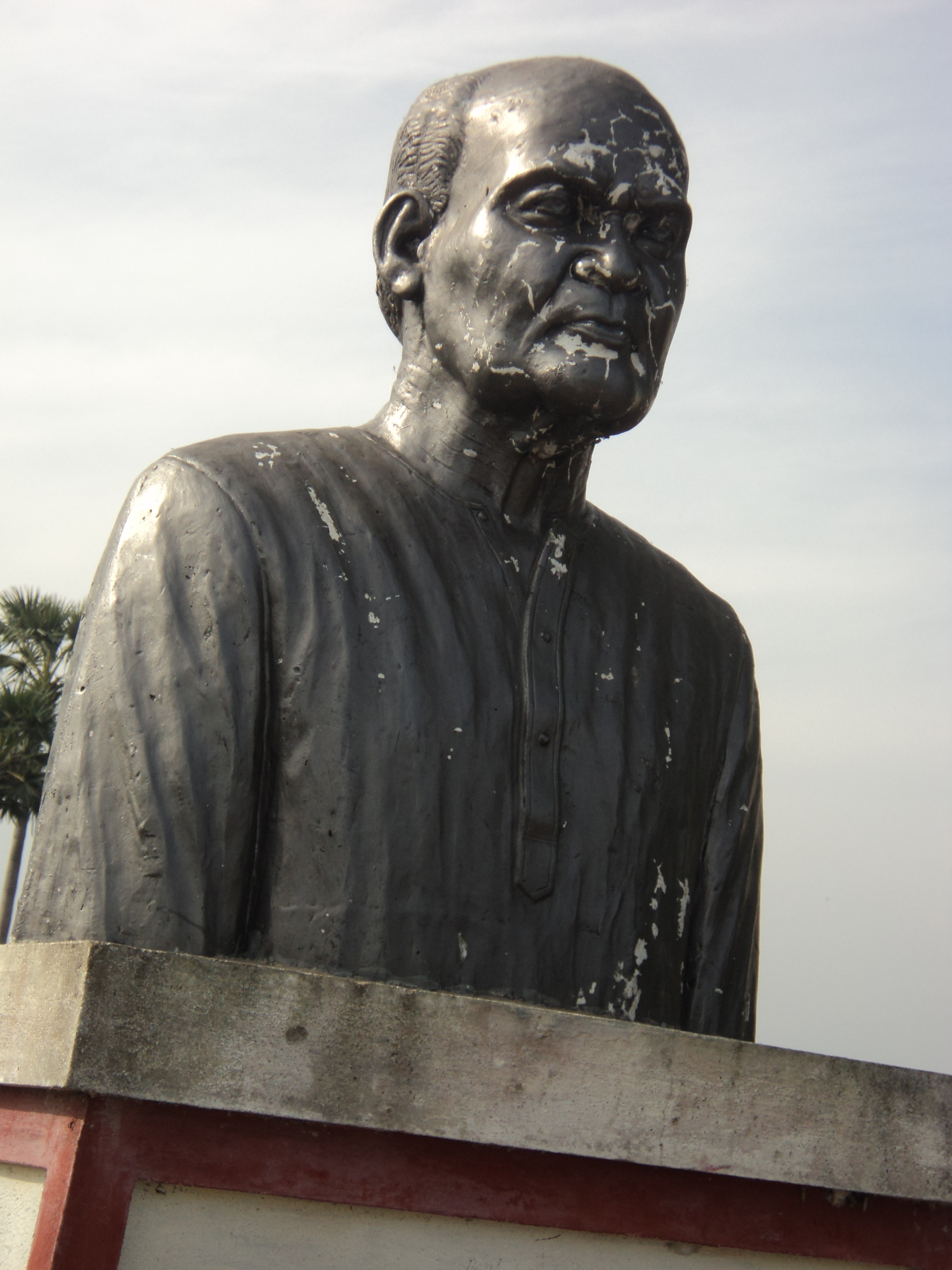
- A statue of Vaddadi Papaiah
- Born: 10 September 1921; Srikakulam, Srikakulam district
- Died: 30 December 1992 (aged 71); Srikakulam, Srikakulam district
- Occupations: Painter, Cover artist
- Website: His life history.

Vaddadi Papaiah (1921–1992), name sometimes spelt Papayya, pen-name Vapa, was a painter, cover artist and illustrator for Telugu magazines, known especially for his covers for the children's magazine Chandamama.

== Childhood ==
Vaddadi Papaiah(telugu:వడ్డాది పాపయ్య) was a famous artist in India. He was born on 10 September 1921 at Srikakulam in Srikakulam district. His parents were Ramamurthy and Mahalakshmi. His father was a drawing teacher. He learnt many skills in drawing from his father. He was a child prodigy and started his career as an artist at the age of 5. He got inspired by Raja Ravi Varma's famous painting of "Kodanda Rama" and drew "Lord Hanuman's" picture. His father narrated to him the famous Hindu mythologies, Mahabharata and Ramayana. These mythologies had a huge impact on him and kindled an interest in Indian sculpture and art.

== Career ==
Papaiah learnt painting from his father, a drawing teacher and went on to publish his first painting in Andhra Jyothi in 1942. He started illustrating for Chandamama c. 1961, and continued do so for many years, painting front & back covers inspired by scenes from Indian mythology and Sanskrit plays. He also did covers for the magazines Yuva and Telugu Naadi.

Vapa's art appears in the Chandamama Art Book, a two-volume publication in which the second volume is devoted to his work.

== As an artist ==
When he started his artist career Kasinadhuni Nageswara Rao encouraged him to publish his pictures in his magazine. He started to draw pictures in the magazines 'Rerani','Manjusha','Abhisarika','Andhra Patrika','Bharathi','Andhra Jyothi' etc., By the friendship of the editor of the magazine "chandamama" he worked as an artist in the magazine for 50 years. At that time the magazine "Chandamama" published in eight languages. Papaiah's pictures popularised in all over India.He also drawn four or five pictures in a month for the monthly magazine "Yuva". After his pictures were published in the weekly and monthly magazines of "Swathi" for 10 years. The pen name was written on his picture is "va.pa."(telugu:'వ.పా.') or the symbol "0|0".Some wise men analyse the symbol as "past was zero, Present is zero and I will stand in future ". He was one of the children books illustrators in India.

== As a writer ==
He was not only an artist but also a writer. He has completed the remaining part of the stories of "DeviBhagavatham" written by Sri Kodavatiganti Kutumbarao in "Chandamama".The famous story "Vishnu katha" also written by him.

== His Works on art ==
- He has drawn the paintings on various Raagas in Indian music.
- Story pictures of Sri Ganesha in "Chandamama"
- He wrote a famous story "Vintha chukka"
- He has drawn famous paintings in many magazines.
- He has drawn a famous painting of "viswa roopa of ganesha" in chandamama magazine.
- A famous painting on the concept of "Pushpa vilapam" . "Pushpa vilapam" was written by the famous writer Jandhyala Papayya Sastry
- A famous portrait on the concept of "Trisanku Swargam" in "Devi Bhagavatham"
- The History of Vaddadi pappayya and his portraits was published in the weekly addition of the news paper "Andhra Bhoomi"
