= SIW (disambiguation) =

SIW or Siw may refer to:

- Substrate-integrated waveguide, a synthetic rectangular electromagnetic waveguide formed in a dielectric substrate
- Self-inflicted wound, the result of harming oneself
- siw, the ISO 639 code for the Siwai language
- SIW, the IATA code for Sibisa Airport
- SIW, the ICAO airline code for Sirio Executive
- SIW,-Strong independent women

== People ==
- Siw Anita Andersen (born 1966), Norwegian actress and comedian
- Siw Malmkvist (born 1936), Swedish schlager singer and actress
- Siw Hughes (born 1958), Welsh actress
- Siw Wittgren-Ahl (born 1951), Swedish social democratic politician

== See also ==
- Siwa (disambiguation)
- Siv (disambiguation)
  - Siv (given name)
