= Shiva (disambiguation) =

Shiva or Shiv or Sivan or Shivan is one of the principal deities of Hinduism.

Shiva, Sheeva, or Siva may also refer to:

== Religion ==
- Shiva, the supreme soul of Brahma Kumaris religion
- Shiva (Judaism), the Jewish ritual of mourning for seven ("shiva") days after the burial of an immediate relative
- Shivā (ending with long 'a'), another name of Parvati, Shiva's consort

== Places ==
- Shiva, Iran, a village in Gilan Province, Iran
- Shiva crater, an apparent impact crater in the Indian Ocean, possibly associated with the Cretaceous–Tertiary extinction event
- Shiva Temple (Grand Canyon), a summit in Arizona, US

== People ==
- Shiva (actor) (born 1983), Tamil actor
- Shiva (rapper) (born 1999), Italian rapper
- Vandana Shiva (born 1952), physicist, philosopher, ecofeminist, environmental activist, and writer
- Cosma Shiva Hagen (born 1981), German actress
- Shiva Ahmadi (born 1975), Iranian-born American visual artist
- Shiva Amini (born 1988 or 1989), women's futsal player
- Shiva Ayyadurai (born 1963), Indian-born American scientist and entrepreneur
- Shiva Raichandani (born 1993), British dancer
- Shiva Rose (born 1969), American actress

== Arts, entertainment, and media ==
=== Fictional entities ===
- Shiva (Āstraverse), main protagonist of an Indian film franchise, portrayed by Ranbir Kapoor
- Sheeva, a Mortal Kombat character
- Shiva (Final Fantasy), a summonable ice elemental in the Final Fantasy franchise
- Shiva (Streets of Rage character), a character in the Streets of Rage video game series
- Shiva, a fictitious strain of Ebola virus from Tom Clancy's novel Rainbow Six
- Shiva, a Bengal tiger cared for and befriended by King Ezekiel in The Walking Dead franchise
- Shivans, the main antagonistic race in the Freespace series
- Lady Shiva, a DC Comics character
- Neosapien General Shiva, a character from the cartoon TV series Exosquad
- Shiva (Marvel Comics), a robotic Weapon X enforcer in Marvel Comics
- The Shiva, the award given to the league winners on the television series The League
- Shiva, the main character of Japanese manga series The Girl from the Other Side: Siúil, a Rún

=== Films ===
- Siva (1989 Tamil film), a film starring Rajinikanth
- Shiva (1989 Telugu film), a film by director Ram Gopal Varma
- Shiva (1990 film), a remake of the Telugu film in Hindi by director Ram Gopal Varma
- Shiva (2006 film), another Hindi remake by Ram Gopal Varma
- Shiva (2008 film), by siblings Ronit and Shlomi Elkabetz
- Shiva (2012 film), a Kannada film starring Shivrajkumar
- Brahmāstra: Part One – Shiva, a 2022 Indian fantasy film, first in the Āstraverse

=== Literature ===
- Shiva trilogy, by Amish Tripathi, comprises: The Immortals of Meluha, The Secret of the Nagas, and The Oath of the Vayuputras
- Shiva, a book by A. B. Yehoshua

=== Music ===
- Shiva (British band), a British dance band featuring vocalist Louise Dean
- "Siva" (song), by Smashing Pumpkins
- "Shiva", a song by JID and EarthGang from Spilligion
- "(Shiva)", an instrumental by Kasabian from the album 48:13

=== Television ===
- Shiva (Fear the Walking Dead), season 2, episode 7 – and the midseason finale episode of – Fear the Walking Dead
- "Shiva" (NCIS), a season 10 episode of NCIS
- Shiva (Marathi TV series), an Indian Marathi language television series aired on Zee Marathi.

== Computing ==
- SheevaPlug, a small form factor computer
- Shiva Corporation, a manufacturer of computer network products

== Science ==
- Shiva Hypothesis, scientific theory concerning impact events
- Shiva laser, built at the Lawrence Livermore National Laboratory in the late 1970s
- Shiva Star, a high-powered plasma weapon research

== Other uses ==
- Shiva (horse) (born 1995), a Thoroughbred racehorse

== See also ==
- Siva (disambiguation)
- Shiv (disambiguation)
- Shivam (disambiguation)
- Sivan (disambiguation)
- Shiwa (disambiguation)
- Siwa (disambiguation)
- Shiba (disambiguation)
- Shib (disambiguation)
- Shiver (disambiguation)
- Sieve (disambiguation)
- Shivaji (disambiguation) (1630–1680), Indian king, founder of the Maratha Empire
- 1170 Siva, an asteroid
- Yeshiva, Jewish schools for religious study
