= Shiva (comics) =

Shiva, in comics, may refer to:

- Lady Shiva, a DC Comics supervillain and assassin
- Shiva, a robotic Weapon X enforcer in Marvel Comics
- Kaiyanwang, a.k.a. Shiva, a fictional character in the manga 3×3 Eyes

== See also ==
- Shiva (disambiguation)
