= SIV =

SIV or Siv may refer to:

== Organizations ==
- Federal Executive Council (Yugoslavia) or Savezno izvršno veće (SIV)
- Sydney Intervarsity Choral Festival
- Sheffield International Venues, a facilities management company in Sheffield, UK
- Surinaamse Islamitische Vereniging, an Islamic association in Suriname

== People ==
- Siv (given name), a feminine given name

== Places ==
- Siv, Iran, a village in Kurdistan Province, Iran
- Siv Kladenets, a village Haskovo Province, Bulgaria

== Science and technology ==
- S IV, a shortcut pronoun for the Samsung Galaxy S4 Android smartphone
- Stress migration (Stress-induced voiding), a failure mechanism in MOSFETs
- Synthetic initialization vector, a nonce-misuse resistant block cipher mode.
- Simian immunodeficiency virus, a virus found in primates and related to HIV
- Swine influenza virus, the cause of influenza in pigs
- Silicon-vacancy center in diamond (Si-V), an optically active defect in diamond

== Transport ==
- SIV, the IATA and FAA code for Sullivan County Airport, Sullivan County, Indiana, USA
- SIV, the National Rail code for St Ives railway station, Cornwall, UK

== Other ==
- Special Immigrant Visa, a type of immigrant visa in the United States
- Structured investment vehicle, a type of fund in the non-bank financial system

== See also ==
- SIW (disambiguation)
- Siva (disambiguation)
- Steve (disambiguation)
