= Sieve (disambiguation) =

A sieve is a tool to separate materials of one characteristic (for example, liquids) from materials of another (for example, solids).

Sieve may also refer to:

== Places ==
- Sieve River in Italy

== Computing ==
- Sieve (mail filtering language), a standard for specifying email filters
- Sieve C++ Parallel Programming System, a compiler for C++

== Mathematics ==
- Sieve (category theory)
- Cyclic sieving, a phenomenon in combinatorics
- Sieve estimator (statistics and econometrics)
- Sieve theory, a technique for counting or filtering sets of numbers
  - General number field sieve
  - Large sieve
  - Quadratic sieve
  - Sieve of Atkin
  - Sieve of Eratosthenes
  - Sieve of Sundaram
  - Sieve of Pritchard

== Science and healthcare ==
- Sieve, in medicine, a "surgical sieve" refers to a very general list of diagnostic or pathological headings, against which any finding can be compared
- Sieving coefficient, used in transport phenomena, in chemistry
- Sieve tube element, an elongated cell in the phloem tissue of flowering plants

== Tools ==
- Sieve, a firefighting tool used when a fire engine drafts water from a body of water; it is a large metal strainer that is attached to the end of a hard suction hose that prevents debris from entering the hose
- Sieve, a gardening tool, known as a riddle, used to separate soil particles and provide a finer tilth, for example by removing stones and twigs
- Sieve, in plumbing, a stainless steel strainer

== Other uses ==
- Sieve (hieroglyph), an ancient Egyptian hieroglyph
- Sieve, or strainer, on rivers is a dangerous obstacle that water can pass through, but people cannot (see Obstacle in whitewater canoeing)
- Sieve, in sports such as hockey or lacrosse, is a common slang term used when referring to a goaltender who allows many or weak goals
- Sieve analysis, a practice or procedure used to assess the particle size distribution of a granular material, such as soil

== See also ==
- CIV (band), a New York City punk rock band pronounced "sieve"
