= Shivam =

Shivam may refer to:

- Shiva, a major Hindu god

== People ==
- Shivam Chauhan (born 1997), Indian cricketer
- Shivam Dubey (born 1993), Indian cricketer
- Shivam Malhotra (born 1991), Indian cricketer
- Shivam Nair, Indian film and television director and editor
- Shivam Patil, Indian actor and dancer
- Shivam Pradhan (died 2016), Indian film actor
- Shivam Sai Gupta (born 1995), Indian visual effect producer, public speaker, and game developer
- Shivam Sharma (born 1993), Indian cricketer
- Shivam Sharma (cricketer, born 2000), Indian cricketer

== Film and television ==
- Shivam (TV series), an Indian mythological television series about the god
- Shivam (2002 film), a 2002 Indian film
- Shivam (2015 Kannada film), 2015 Indian Kannada-language film
- Shivam (2015 Telugu film), a 2015 Indian Telugu-language film

== See also ==
- Shiva (disambiguation)
