= Sivan, Iran =

Sivan (Persian: سيوان) in Iran may refer to:

- Sivan, East Azerbaijan
- Sivan, Marand, East Azerbaijan province
- Sivan, Fars
- Sivan, West Azerbaijan
- Sivan District, an administrative division of Ilam County, Ilam province
