= Shiva (soundtrack) =

Siva

Soundtrack album by Ilaiyaraaja
- Released: 1989
- Genre: Feature film soundtrack
- Length: 28:20
- Language: Telugu
- Label: Aditya Music
- Producer: Ilaiyaraaja

Ilaiyaraaja chronology
Geethanjali (1989)	Siva (1989)	Indrudu Chandrudu (1989)

The five-song soundtrack album and background score of the 1989 Telugu-language crime action film of the same name is composed by Ilaiyaraaja. The film, directed by Ram Gopal Varma and produced by Annapurna Studios and SS Creations, stars Nagarjuna, Amala Akkineni, Raghuvaran and J. D. Chakravarthy. Veturi Sundararama Murthy and Sirivennela Seetharama Sastry wrote lyrics for the songs, while S. P. Balasubrahmanyam, S. Janaki, K. S. Chithra, S. P. Sailaja and Mano were the singers. The soundtrack was successful and was acclaimed as one of Ilaiyaraaja's best works in Telugu cinema.

== Background and production ==
Initially, Varma wanted M. M. Keeravani to compose music for the film, since he assisted K. Chakravarthy on Rao Gari Illu (1988), where Varma worked as an assistant director. As Keeravani was inexperienced, he suggested a more seasoned technician to work on the film, which resulted in Ilayaraaja's inclusion. Siva is Ilaiyaraaja's third collaboration with Nagarjuna, after he previously worked with Sankeertana (1987) and Aakhari Poratam (1988).

Due to a strike in Madras, Ilaiyaraaja and Varma shifted to Mumbai for recording the background score. The producers suggested Varma to use stock tunes instead for the score. Nagarjuna noticed this and asked them to provide what Varma asked for, and offered to pay the additional expenses incurred if any. For an action scene, Ilaiyaraaja used moving string music; when Varma asked why, he answered: "They have come here to study and they are fighting. So I just felt sad for them". Deepan Chatterjee was hired as the film's sound designer after Varma being impressed with his work in Sindhoora Puvvu (1988). Ismail Darbar, who later composed the music for Hum Dil De Chuke Sanam (1999) and Devdas (2002), worked with Ilaiyaraaja on Siva as a violinist.

== Music video ==
Mugur Sundar choreographed the film's songs; "Anando Brahma" was filmed at the interiors of Borra Caves in Visakhapatnam and "Botany" was shot at the Keyes High school, near Secunderabad Junction railway station, where the college portions had been filmed there. The remaining songs were filmed on sets at Annapurna Studios. For the Hindi-language remake Shiva (1990) all the songs were retained from the Telugu version, except "Botany" which was re-shot at the Acharya N. G. Ranga Agricultural University in Rajendranagar.

== Track list ==
No.	Title	Lyrics	Artist(s)	Length
1.	"Sarasalu"	Sirivennela Seetharama Sastry	Mano, S. Janaki	05:07
2.	"Botany"	Sirivennela Seetharama Sastry	S. P. Sailaja, S. P. Balasubrahmanyam	04:26
3.	"Anando Brahma"	Veturi	K. S. Chithra, S. P. Balasubrahmanyam	04:29
4.	"Enniyalo"	Veturi	K. S. Chithra, S. P. Balasubrahmanyam	04:18
5.	"Kiss Me Hello"	Veturi	K. S. Chithra, S. P. Balasubrahmanyam	04:30
Total length:				28:20

== Reception and legacy ==
The film's music and the sound design received acclaim from critics, which was instrumental in the film's successful theatrical run. Vikram Venkateswaran of The Quint described "Botany" as the "quintessential college song" where "Ilaiyaraaja got the tune just right". Varma dedicated the background score of his Rowdy (2014), composed by Sai Karthik, to Ilaiyaraaja. Adapting the background score of the cycle-chase scene in Rowdy, Varma said that his main interest was "to bring back this composition to express the great idea of the genius [Ilaiyaraaja's] 1989 soundtrack (of Siva) to 2014". The track was named under the title "Cycle Rowdy" as the seventeenth-track from the 22-track album containing the film's score released in March 2014. Before his debut in film industry, music director Munna Kasi recalled that he was inspired by Ilaiyaraaja's work from the film.

== Bibliography ==
- Chinnarayana, Pulagam (August 2007). "శివ—సెల్యులాయిడ్ చరిత్రలో సహజావేశం" [Siva—A natural frustration in the history of celluloid]. Telugu Naadi (in Telugu). United States. ISSN 1559-7008. Archived from the original on 31 May 2016.
