= Živa =

Živa may refer to:

- Živa (mythology), a mother goddess in Slavic mythology
- Živa (Vajska), small settlement near Vajska, Serbia
- Živa (journal), journal founded by Jan Evangelista Purkyně
