= Shib =

Shib may refer to:

- Shib (village), a village in Iran
- SHIB, the code for the cryptocurrency Shiba Inu coin

== See also ==
- Shiba (disambiguation)
- Shiva (disambiguation)
- Chib (disambiguation)
