= Sivan (disambiguation) =

Sivan is a month of the Hebrew calendar.

Sivan may also refer to:

- Shiva or Shivan or Sivan (Hindu deity) or Siva, name of a Hindu god
- Indian given name derived from name of the god Shiva

== People ==
=== Given name ===
==== Sivan ====
- Sivan Fahima (born 1983), Israeli footballer
- Sivan Klein (born 1984), Israeli beauty queen
- Sivan Levy (born 1987), Israeli singer-songwriter, filmmaker, and actress
- Sivan Malkin Maas, first Israeli to be ordained as a rabbi in Humanistic Judaism
- Sivan Rahav-Meir (born 1981), Israeli journalist, news reporter, and TV and radio anchor
- Sivan Shavit, Israeli singer

==== Şivan ====
- Şivan Perwer (born 1955), Kurdish poet, writer, musical teacher, singer, and performer on the Bağlama in Turkey

=== Surname ===
- Daniel Sivan (born 1949), Israeli professor of Hebrew language
- Eyal Sivan (born 1964), Israeli documentary filmmaker, theoretician and scholar
- Meskie Shibru-Sivan (born 1967), Israeli actress and vocalist
- Ori Sivan (born 1963), Israeli film and television director and screenwriter
- Rotem Sivan, Israeli jazz guitarist
- Troye Sivan (born 1995), South African–born Australian singer-songwriter, actor and YouTuber
- Uri Sivan (born 1955), Israeli physicist, President of the Technion – Israel Institute of Technology

=== Indian surname ===
In Indian names, the name Sivan some times used as patronymic, not a family name, and the person will be referred to by the given name.

- Kailasavadivoo Sivan (born 1957), chairman of the Indian Space Research Organisation
- Ket Sivan (born 1981), Khmer swimmer
- Neelakanta Sivan (1839–1900), Indian composer of Carnatic music
- Papanasam Sivan (1890–1973), Indian composer of Carnatic music and a singer
- Sangeeth Sivan (1959-2024), Indian film director and screenwriter who works in Malayalam and Hindi cinemas
- Sanjeev Sivan, Indian film director
- Santosh Sivan (born 1964), Indian cinematographer, film director, producer and actor known for his works in Malayalam, Tamil and Hindi cinema

== Places ==
- Sivan, Iran (disambiguation)

== Arts and entertainment ==
- Sivan (film), a 1999 Tamil-language film

== Business and economy ==
- Sivan design group

== See also ==
- Siva (disambiguation)
- Shiva (disambiguation)
