= Chib =

Chib may refer to:

== Persons with the name ==
- Chibuzor Chilaka (born 1986), nickname "Chib", Nigerian footballer
- Malini Chib (born 1966), Indian social activist
- Prakash Singh Chib (1913–1945), British Indian Army officer
- Siddhartha Chib, Professor of Econometrics and Statistics at Washington University in St. Louis, Missouri, United States
- Baba Shadi Shaheed (formerly Maharaja Dharam Chand Chib), a Sufi saint

== Other uses ==
- Chib, a social subgroup associated with the Chibhal princely state of India
- CHIB, a defunct radio station of Chibougamau, Quebec, Canada
- Čib, today Čelarevo, a village in the Bačka Palanka Municipality, South Bačka District, Serbia

== See also ==
- Cib (disambiguation)
- Chiba (disambiguation)
- Shib (disambiguation)
