= John N. Shive =

American physicist

- John N. Shive demonstrates his wave machine in this 1959 educational film Similarities in Wave Behavior aimed at undergraduates
- Born: John Northrop Shive; February 22, 1913; Baltimore, Maryland, US
- Died: June 1, 1984 (aged 71); Lincroft, New Jersey, US
- Education: Rutgers University (BS), Johns Hopkins University (PhD)
- Known for: Transistor development Phototransistor; Shive wave machine
- Spouse: Helen Shive
- Scientific career
- Fields: Physics
- Workplaces: Bell Labs

John Northrop Shive (February 22, 1913 – June 1, 1984) was an American physicist and inventor. He made notable contributions in electronic engineering and solid-state physics during the early days of transistor development at Bell Laboratories. In particular, he produced experimental evidence that holes could diffuse through bulk germanium, and not just along the surface as previously thought. This paved the way from Bardeen and Brattain's point-contact transistor to Shockley's more-robust junction transistor. Shive is best known for inventing the phototransistor in 1948 (a device that combines the sensitivity to light of a photodiode and the current gain of a transistor), and for the Shive wave machine in 1959 (an educational apparatus used to illustrate wave motion).

== Early life and education ==
John N. Shive was born in Baltimore, Maryland, on February 22, 1913, and grew up in New Jersey. Shive graduated from Rutgers University with a BS in physics and chemistry in 1934. He also earned a PhD from Johns Hopkins University, submitting a dissertation Practice and theory of the modulation of Geiger counters in 1939. Shive became a fellow of the American Physical Society, a member of the American Association for the Advancement of Science, and was a member of the Phi Beta Kappa and Sigma Xi fraternities.

== Scientific career ==
John N. Shive joined Bell Telephone Laboratories in 1939. Shive worked initially on physical research and device development, and later on education and training. After retirement from industry, he worked as an adjunct professor of physics at Georgian Court University. The spherical sundial on campus, in front of the bookstore and next to the library, is dedicated to his memory.

=== Transistor development ===
On January 30, 1948 Shive discovered that gold-plated tungsten point contacts on a p-type layer of germanium grown on an n-type substrate gave "a terrific triode effect". On February 13, he also discovered that a transistor consisting of bronze contacts on the surface of an n-type substrate without a p-layer gave "gains up to 40× in power!" He leveraged this discovery to build a point contact transistor with bronze contacts on the front and back of thin wedge of germanium, proving that holes could diffuse through bulk germanium and not just along the surface as previously thought. This confirmed William Shockley's idea that it should be possible to build a junction transistor, an idea that hitherto he had kept secret from the rest of the team. Shockley later admitted that the workings of the team were a "mixture of cooperation and competition". He also admitted that he kept some of his own work secret until his "hand was forced" by Shive's 1948 advance.

=== Phototransistor ===
In 1948 Shive invented the phototransistor that used a beam of light, instead of a wire, as the emitter of a point contact transistor, generating holes that flow to the collector. Bell Labs announced the invention in 1950. The phototransistor was eventually used in the nationwide direct distance dialing system.

=== Shive wave machine ===
This Wave Machine model simulates the wave machine produced by John Shive at Bell Laboratories and made famous by the PSSC Simple Waves film. The machine consists of 64 horizontal rods welded to an axle torsion bar that is perpendicular to the rods. Notice that the wave inverts as it reflects from each non-fixed end.

Shive was a gifted lecturer, and became Director of Education and Training at Bell Telephone Laboratories. He was responsible for curriculum and administration of educational programs provided to employees of Bell Laboratories.

In this new role, he invented the Shive wave machine (also known as the Shive wave generator). The wave generator illustrates wave motion using a series of steel rods joined by a thin torsion wire which transmits energy from one rod to the next. The high moment of inertia of each rod ensures the wave takes several seconds to traverse the entire series of rods, making the dynamics easily visible. The motion is analogous to high-frequency waves that are invisible to the human eye, such as electromagnetic waves on a transmission line. The wave generator could illustrate wave reflection, standing waves, resonance, partial reflection, and impedance matching. Shive made two educational films in which he demonstrated the machine, Simple Waves and Similarities in Wave Behavior, and wrote a book with the same name as the latter.

Today, the Exploratorium Exhibit Services manufactures a large-scale version of the machine for use in science museums and schools.

== Patents ==
Shive held several patents including Selenium rectifier and method of making it, Directly heated thermocouple, Photoresistive translating device, Selenium rectifier including tellurium and method of making it, Apparatus for and method of treating selenium rectifiers, Semiconductor photoelectric device, Conditioning of semiconductor translators, Semiconductor amplifier, and Alternating gate current.

== Books ==
Shive authored three books during his career, beginning with The Properties, Physics, and Design of Semiconductor Devices (1959), a book about semiconductor devices. This was followed by Similarities of Wave Behavior (1961), a book designed to help college professors teach students about waves using the machine he invented. His last book, Similarities in Physics (1982), was coauthored with Robert L. Weber. He was also one of the editors of Transistor Technology, Volume 1.

== Honors ==
John N. Shive was a fellow of the American Physical Society and a Senior Member of the Institute of Electrical and Electronics Engineers. He was also a chairman of the Advisory Committee on the Pre-College Physics Project of the American Institute of Physics.

== Personal life ==
Shive was married to Helen Conner, and the two were the parents of Peter, Jonathan, and Elaine. From 1974 to 1984 Shive was faculty lecturer in physics at Georgian Court College of Lakewood, New Jersey. He died on 3 June 1984 at the Riverview Medical Center in Red Bank, New Jersey.

== Selected works ==
- J. N. Shive, Physical Review, vol. 75, p. 318, 1949.
- J. N. Shive, Physical Review, vol. 75, p. 689, 1949.
- J. A. Becker and J. N. Shive, "The Transistor – A New Semiconductor Amplifier," The Electrical Engineer., vol 68, no. 3, pp. 215–221, Mar. 1949. doi:10.1109/JPROC.1999.775422
- J. N. Shive, "The Properties of Germanium Phototransistors", JOSA, vol. 43, no. 4, pp. 239–243, 1953. doi:10.1364/JOSA.43.000239
- John N. Shive and Robert L. Weber, Similarities in Physics. New York, NY: Wiley, 1982. ISBN 978-0471897958.
