= Shiba =

Shiba may refer to:

- Shiba Inu, a breed of dog
- Shiba clan, Japanese clan originating in the Sengoku period
- Shiba Inu (cryptocurrency), a decentralized cryptocurrency

== Geography ==
- Shiba, Tokyo, a former ward of Tokyo, Japan
- Shiba Park in Tokyo
- Shiba, Mingguang, in Mingguang, Anhui, PR China
- Shiba, Boluo County, in Boluo County, Guangdong, PR China

== People with the surname ==
- Cristian Shiba (born 2001), Albanian footballer
- Shiba Kōkan (1747–1818), Japanese painter and printmaker of the Edo period
- Masaki Shiba (斯波 正樹, born 1986), Japanese snowboarder
- Ryotaro Shiba (1923–1996), Japanese author
- Shigeharu Shiba (born 1932), anime audio director and producer
- Shiba Takatsune (1305–1367), the Constable (shugo) of Echizen Province during the 14th century
- Shiba Yoshimasa (1350–1410), Japanese general and administrator during the Muromachi period

Fictional characters:

- Kūkaku Shiba, Ganju Shiba and Kaien Shiba, fictional characters in Bleach
- Tatsuya Shiba and Miyuki Shiba, fictional characters in The Irregular at Magic High School
- Takeru Shiba and Kaoru Shiba, fictional characters in Samurai Sentai Shinkenger
- Jayden Shiba and Lauren Shiba, fictional characters in Power Rangers: Samurai

== Others ==
- Shiba (film), a 2002 Indian film starring Sonali Chowdhury

== See also ==
- Sheba (disambiguation)
- Shiva (disambiguation)
- Shib (disambiguation)
