= Shive (disambiguation) =

A shive is a fitting used in ale casks.

Shive may also refer to:

== People ==
- Ian Shive, American nature and conservation photographer
- John N. Shive (1913–1984), American physicist and inventor
- Madigan Shive, American composer and musician

== Other ==
- Shive (papermaking), incompletely cooked wood fibres in the pulp
- Shive, Texas, a small town in Hamilton County, Texas
- Shive wave machine, a device used to demonstrate wave mechanics

== See also ==
- Shives, the woody waste material from flax, hemp, and linseed plants
