= Sift (company) =

American software company

- Type: Private
- Industry: Enterprise software
- Founded: 2022 in Los Angeles, California, U.S.
- Founders: Austin Spiegel; Karthik Gollapudi
- Headquarters: Marina del Rey, California, U.S.
- Key people: Austin Spiegel (CEO)
- Products: Telemetry and observability software
- Number of employees: 80 (2026)
- Website: siftstack.com

Sift is an American software company that develops telemetry and observability infrastructure for hardware systems. The company was founded in 2022 by former SpaceX software engineers Austin Spiegel and Karthik Gollapudi. Its primary product is a platform used by engineering teams in the aerospace, defense, and autonomous systems industries to ingest, store, and analyze data from machine sensors. It is headquartered in Marina del Rey, California, and has raised approximately $67 million in venture capital.

== History ==
=== Founding ===
Sift was founded in mid-2022 in Los Angeles by Austin Spiegel and Karthik Gollapudi, who had previously worked as software engineers at SpaceX. Spiegel spent nearly five years at the company working on internal tools including manufacturing systems, test automation, and the telemetry system for Starlink; Gollapudi spent four years there and led the flight software operations team for the Dragon spacecraft.

The founders have described the 2019 failure of Boeing's Starliner Orbital Flight Test as an impetus for the company. Gollapudi has said he initially assumed the failure was mechanical and was surprised to learn that software testing and development practices were implicated, which led him to conclude that practices he had regarded as standard at SpaceX were not widely shared across the industry.

=== Funding ===
Sift emerged from stealth in November 2023 with a $7.5 million seed round from investors including Riot Ventures, Fika Ventures, First Resonance, Datum, and Duro; Riot Ventures had led an earlier investment in the company in 2022. At the time, the company employed about ten engineers.

In June 2024, Sift raised a $17.5 million Series A round led by GV, bringing total funding to $25 million.

A $42 million Series B round was announced in March 2026, led by StepStone Group with participation from GV, Riot Ventures, Fika Ventures, and CIV, bringing total funding to $67 million. Gollapudi told TechCrunch that the round had been raised in 2025 at a post-money valuation of $274 million.

=== Leadership and expansion ===
In May 2026, co-founder Austin Spiegel was named chief executive officer, succeeding Gollapudi, who moved to a role focused on product direction and industry outreach. The company opened a second office in San Francisco alongside its Marina del Rey headquarters and reported a workforce of approximately 80 employees.

== Technology ==
Sift's platform ingests, stores, visualizes, and analyzes telemetry generated by hardware during testing, manufacturing, and operation. Its early product was organized around three components: data storage, real-time analytics, and visualization. The platform can align sensor data from different sources around a common event, allowing engineers to compare readings across repeated tests such as successive firings of a rocket engine.

The company has described telemetry in aerospace applications as sampling individual sensors up to 50,000 times per second, producing volumes of data that are difficult to store and query, and has cited the difficulty of reconciling continuously generated operational data with test data captured in discrete intervals. Sift uses object storage for data that is written once and accessed infrequently, which the company says reduces storage costs.

Rather than requiring operators to monitor data manually, the platform encodes rules describing expected machine behavior and raises alerts when readings fall outside those parameters. The company has said the platform performs automated anomaly detection and root-cause analysis across the hardware lifecycle. By 2026, Sift reported working with vehicles carrying more than 1.5 million sensors streaming data concurrently across multiple formats and time scales.

== Customers and applications ==
Sift's software has been used in the aerospace, defense, rail, robotics, and advanced manufacturing sectors. As of 2024, reported users included Astranis, Astrolab, K2 Space, Mach Industries, Parallel Systems, and True Anomaly. In 2026, TechCrunch reported that customers included United Launch Alliance, other defense contractors, and robotics and power-grid startups. Impulse Space, K2 Space, and Parallel Systems have also been named among users of the platform.

Jeff Dexter, vice president of software at the satellite manufacturer Astranis, told TechCrunch that his company uses Sift across testing, manufacturing, and operations, and cited data storage costs as a motivation for adopting it.

Sift is listed as one of the software services available through the Knox Systems FedRAMP High Managed Platform, a managed cloud platform used to deliver commercial software to United States federal agencies.

Fast Company named Sift to its Next Big Things in Tech list for 2024, in the transportation category, citing its approach to unifying telemetry data.
