= 140 Siwa =

Main-belt asteroid

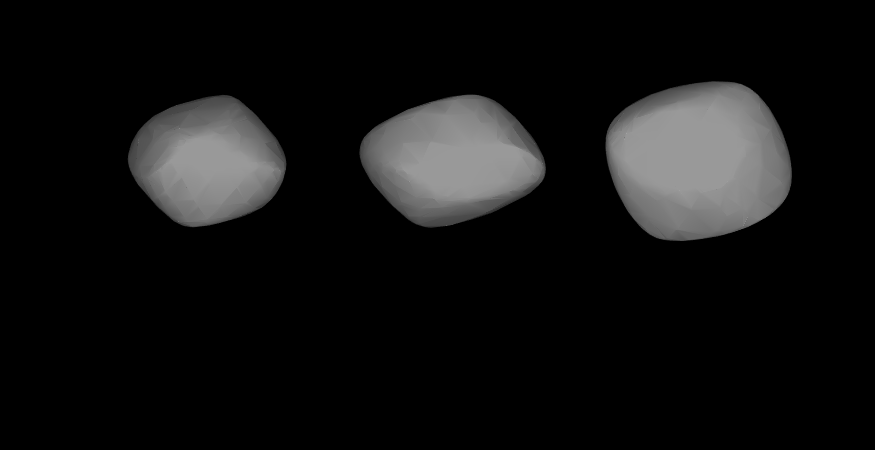
- Lightcurve-based 3D model of 140 Siwa

Discovery
- Discovered by: J. Palisa
- Discovery site: Austrian Naval Obs.
- Discovery date: 13 October 1874

Designations
- Pronunciation: /ˈʃiːwə/
- Named after: Živa
- Alternative designations: A874 TB; 1948 AL
- Minor planet category: Main belt

Orbital characteristics
- Epoch 31 July 2016 (JD 2457600.5)
- Uncertainty parameter 0
- Observation arc: 139.10 yr (50805 d)
- Aphelion: 3.3224 AU (497.02 Gm)
- Perihelion: 2.14323 AU (320.623 Gm)
- Semi-major axis: 2.73283 AU (408.826 Gm)
- Eccentricity: 0.21575
- Orbital period (sidereal): 4.52 yr (1650.1 d)
- Average orbital speed: 17.80 km/s
- Mean anomaly: 200.674°
- Mean motion: 0° 13^{m} 5.398^{s} / day
- Inclination: 3.1860°
- Longitude of ascending node: 107.263°
- Argument of perihelion: 196.711°

Physical characteristics
- Dimensions: 109.79±3.0 km
- Mass: (9.1±2.1)×10^{17} kg (Note: Calculated from its standard gravitational parameter GM = 0.061±0.014 km^{3}/s^{2}.)
- Mean density: 1.32 g/cm^{3}
- Synodic rotation period: 34.445 h (1.4352 d); 34.407 h
- Geometric albedo: 0.0676±0.004
- Spectral type: C-type asteroid
- Absolute magnitude (H): 8.34

140 Siwa is a large and dark main-belt asteroid that was discovered by Austrian astronomer Johann Palisa on October 13, 1874. It was named after Živa (Šiwa), a Slavic goddess of fertility. This object is orbiting the Sun at a distance of 2.73 AU with an eccentricity of 0.22 and an orbital period of 4.52 years. The orbital plane is inclined at an angle of 3.2°.

A 2004 study of the spectrum of 140 Siwa matched a typical C-type asteroid with typical carbonaceous chondrite makeup. There are no absorption features of mafic minerals found. The classification was later revised to a P-type asteroid.

Infrared measurement yields a diameter estimate of 110 km. Attempts to measure the rotation period of 140 Siwa have produced inconsistent results ranging from 14.7 to 32 hours. Photometric observations of this asteroid at the Organ Mesa Observatory in Las Cruces, New Mexico during 2010 gave an irregular light curve with a period of 34.407 ± 0.002 hours and a brightness variation of 0.05 ± 0.01 in magnitude.

The Rosetta comet probe was to visit Siwa on its way to comet 46P/Wirtanen in July, 2008. However, the mission was rerouted to comet 67P/Churyumov-Gerasimenko and the flyby had to be abandoned.
