= Sivan, West Azerbaijan =

Sivan سيوان
- Village
- Location within Iran
- Coordinates: 38°26′31″N 44°52′50″E
- Country: Iran
- Province: West Azerbaijan
- County: Khoy
- Bakhsh: Central
- Rural District: Rahal

Population (2006)
  - Total: 214
- Time zone: UTC+3:30 (IRST)
  - Summer (DST): UTC+4:30 (IRDT)

Sivan (Persian: سيوان, also Romanized as Sīvān) is a village in Rahal Rural District, in the Central District of Khoy County, West Azerbaijan Province, Iran. At the 2006 census, its population was 214, in 48 families.
