= Sieve of Pritchard =

Algorithm for generating prime numbers

Sieve of Pritchard: algorithm steps for primes up to 150

In mathematics, the sieve of Pritchard is an algorithm for finding all prime numbers up to a specified bound. Like the ancient sieve of Eratosthenes, it has a simple conceptual basis in number theory. It is especially suited to quick hand computation for small bounds.

Whereas the sieve of Eratosthenes marks off each non-prime for each of its prime factors, the sieve of Pritchard avoids considering almost all non-prime numbers by building progressively larger wheels, which represent the pattern of numbers not divisible by any of the primes processed thus far. It thereby achieves a better asymptotic complexity, and was the first sieve with a running time sublinear in the specified bound. Its asymptotic running-time has not been improved on, and it deletes fewer composites than any other known sieve. It was created in 1979 by Paul Pritchard.

Since Pritchard has created a number of other sieve algorithms for finding prime numbers, the sieve of Pritchard is sometimes singled out by being called the wheel sieve (by Pritchard himself) or the dynamic wheel sieve.

== Overview ==
A prime number is a natural number that has no natural number divisors other than the number 1 and itself.

To find all the prime numbers less than or equal to a given integer N, a sieve algorithm examines a set of candidates in the range 2, 3, …, N, and eliminates those that are not prime, leaving the primes at the end. The sieve of Eratosthenes examines all of the range, first removing all multiples of the first prime 2, then of the next prime 3, and so on. The sieve of Pritchard instead examines a subset of the range consisting of numbers that occur on successive wheels, which represent the pattern of numbers left after each successive prime is processed by the sieve of Eratosthenes.

For i > 0, the ith wheel W_{i} represents this pattern. It is the set of numbers between 1 and the product P_{i} = p_{1} · p_{2} ⋯ p_{i} of the first i prime numbers that are not divisible by any of these prime numbers (and is said to have an associated length P_{i}). This is because adding P_{i} to a number does not change whether it is divisible by one of the first i prime numbers, since the remainder on division by any one of these primes is unchanged.

So W_{1} = {1} with length P_{1} = 2 represents the pattern of odd numbers; W_{2} = {1,5} with length P_{2} = 6 represents the pattern of numbers not divisible by 2 or 3; etc. Wheels are so-called because W_{i} can be usefully visualized as a circle of circumference P_{i} with its members marked at their corresponding distances from an origin. Then rolling the wheel along the number line marks points corresponding to successive numbers not divisible by one of the first i prime numbers. The animation shows W_{2} being rolled up to 30.

Rolling the 2nd wheel up to 30.

It is useful to define W_{i} → n for n > 0 to be the result of rolling W_{i} up to n. Then the animation generates W_{2} → 30 = {1,5,7,11,13,17,19,23,25,29}. Note that up to 5^{2} − 1 = 24, this consists only of 1 and the primes between 5 and 25.

The sieve of Pritchard is derived from the observation that this holds generally: for all i > 0, the values in W_{i} → (p^{2}_{i+1} − 1) are 1 and the primes between p_{i+1} and p^{2}_{i+1}. It even holds for i = 0, where the wheel has length 1 and contains just 1 (representing all the natural numbers). So the sieve of Pritchard starts with the trivial wheel W_{0} and builds successive wheels until the square of the wheel's first member after 1 is at least N. Wheels grow very quickly, but only their values up to N are needed and generated.

It remains to find a method for generating the next wheel. Note in the animation that W_{3} = {1,5,7,11,13,17,19,23,25,29} − {5 · 1 , 5 · 5} can be obtained by rolling W_{2} up to 30 and then removing 5 times each member of W_{2}.This also holds generally: for all i ≥ 0, W_{i+1} = (W_{i} → P_{i+1}) − {p_{i+1} · w | w ∈ W_{i}}. Rolling W_{i} past P_{i} just adds values to W_{i}, so the current wheel is first extended by getting each successive member starting with w = 1, adding P_{i} to it, and inserting the result in the set. Then the multiples of p_{i+1} are deleted. Care must be taken to avoid a number being deleted that itself needs to be multiplied by p_{i+1}. The sieve of Pritchard as originally presented does so by first skipping past successive members until finding the maximum one needed, and then doing the deletions in reverse order by working back through the set. This is the method used in the first animation above. A simpler approach is just to gather the multiples of p_{i+1} in a list, and then delete them. Another approach is given by Gries and Misra.

If the main loop terminates with a wheel whose length is less than N, it is extended up to N to generate the remaining primes.

The algorithm, for finding all primes up to N, is therefore as follows:

1. Start with a set W = {1} and length = 1 representing wheel 0, and prime p = 2.
2. As long as p^{2} ≤ N, do the following:
  1. if length < N, then
    1. extend W by repeatedly getting successive members w of W starting with 1 and inserting length + w into W as long as it does not exceed p · length or N;
    2. increase length to the minimum of p · length and N.
  2. repeatedly delete p times each member of W by first finding the largest ≤ length and then working backwards.
  3. note the prime p, then set p to the next member of W after 1 (or 3 if p was 2).
3. if length < N, then extend W to N by repeatedly getting successive members w of W starting with 1 and inserting length + w into W as long as it does not exceed N;
4. On termination, the rest of the primes up to N are the members of W after 1.

=== Example ===
To find all the prime numbers less than or equal to 150, proceed as follows.

Start with wheel 0 with length 1, representing all natural numbers 1, 2, 3...:

  1

The first number after 1 for wheel 0 (when rolled) is 2; note it as a prime. Now form wheel 1 with length 2 × 1 = 2 by first extending wheel 0 up to 2 and then deleting 2 times each number in wheel 0, to get:

  1 2

The first number after 1 for wheel 1 (when rolled) is 3; note it as a prime. Now form wheel 2 with length 3 × 2 = 6 by first extending wheel 1 up to 6 and then deleting 3 times each number in wheel 1, to get

  1 2 3 5

The first number after 1 for wheel 2 is 5; note it as a prime. Now form wheel 3 with length 5 × 6 = 30 by first extending wheel 2 up to 30 and then deleting 5 times each number in wheel 2 (in reverse order), to get

  1 2 3 5 7 11 13 17 19 23 25 29

The first number after 1 for wheel 3 is 7; note it as a prime. Now wheel 4 has length 7 × 30 = 210, so we only extend wheel 3 up to our limit 150. (No further extending will be done now that the limit has been reached.) We then delete 7 times each number in wheel 3 until we exceed our limit 150, to get the elements in wheel 4 up to 150:

  1 2 3 5 7 11 13 17 19 23 25 29 31 37 41 43 47 49 53 59 61 67 71 73 77 79 83 89 91 97 101 103 107 109 113 119 121 127 131 133 137 139 143 149

The first number after 1 for this partial wheel 4 is 11; note it as a prime. Since we have finished with rolling, we delete 11 times each number in the partial wheel 4 until we exceed our limit 150, to get the elements in wheel 5 up to 150:

  1 2 3 5 7 11 13 17 19 23 25 29 31 37 41 43 47 49 53 59 61 67 71 73 77 79 83 89 91 97 101 103 107 109 113 119 121 127 131 133 137 139 143 149

The first number after 1 for this partial wheel 5 is 13. Since 13 squared is at least our limit 150, we stop. The remaining numbers (other than 1) are the rest of the primes up to our limit 150.

Just 8 composite numbers are removed, once each. The rest of the numbers considered (other than 1) are prime. In comparison, the natural version of Eratosthenes sieve (stopping at the same point) removes composite numbers 184 times.

== Pseudocode ==
The sieve of Pritchard can be expressed in pseudocode, as follows:

algorithm Sieve of Pritchard is
    input: an integer N >= 2.
    output: the set of prime numbers in {1,2,...,N}.

    let W and Pr be sets of integer values, and all other variables integer values.
    k, W, length, p, Pr := 1, {1}, 2, 3, {2};
    {invariant: p = pk+1 and W = Wk 
  
    
      
        ∩
      
    
    {\displaystyle \cap }
  
 {1,2,...,N} and length = minimum of Pk,N and Pr = the primes up to pk}
    while p2 <= N do
        if (length < N) then
            Extend W,length to minimum of p*length,N; 
        Delete multiples of p from W; 
        Insert p into Pr; 
        k, p := k+1, next(W, 1) 
    if (length < N) then
        Extend W,length to N;

    return Pr 
  
    
      
        ∪
      
    
    {\displaystyle \cup }
  
 W - {1};

where next(W, w) is the next value in the ordered set W after w.

procedure Extend W,length to n is
    {in: W = Wk and length = Pk and n > length}
    {out: W = Wk
  
    
      
        →
      
    
    {\displaystyle \rightarrow }
  
n and length = n}

    integer w, x;
    w, x := 1, length+1;
    while x <= n do
        Insert x into W;
        w := next(W,w);
        x := length + w;
    length := n;

procedure Delete multiples of p from W,length is
    integer w;
    w := p;
    while p*w <= length do
        w := next(W,w);
    while w > 1 do
        w := prev(W,w);
        Remove p*w from W;

where prev(W, w) is the previous value in the ordered set W before w. The algorithm can be initialized with W_{0} instead of W_{1} at the minor complication of making next(W, 1) a special case when k = 0.

This abstract algorithm uses ordered sets supporting the operations of insertion of a value greater than the maximum, deletion of a member, getting the next value after a member, and getting the previous value before a member. Using one of Mertens' theorems (the third) it can be shown to use O(N / log log N) of these operations and additions and multiplications.

== Implementation ==
An array-based doubly-linked list s can be used to implement the ordered set W, with s[w] storing next(W,w) and s[w-1] storing prev(W,w). This permits each abstract operation to be implemented in a small number of operations. (The array can also be used to store the set Pr "for free".) Therefore the time complexity of the sieve of Pritchard to calculate the primes up to N in the random access machine model is O(N / log log N) operations on words of size O(log N). Pritchard also shows how multiplications can be eliminated by using very small multiplication tables, so the bit complexity is O(N log N / log log N) bit operations.

In the same model, the space complexity is O(N) words, i.e., O(N log N) bits. The sieve of Eratosthenes requires only 1 bit for each candidate in the range 2 through N, so its space complexity is lower at O(N) bits. Note that space needed for the primes is not counted, since they can printed or written to external storage as they are found. Pritchard presented a variant of his sieve that requires only O(N / log log N) bits without compromising the sublinear time complexity, making it asymptotically superior to the natural version of the sieve of Eratostheses in both time and space.

However, the sieve of Eratostheses can be optimized to require much less memory by operating on successive segments of the natural numbers. Its space complexity can be reduced to O(√N) bits without increasing its time complexity. This means that in practice it can be used for much larger limits N than would otherwise fit in memory, and also take advantage of fast cache memory. For maximum speed, it is also optimized using a small wheel to avoid sieving with the first few primes (although this does not change its asymptotic time complexity). Therefore the sieve of Pritchard is not competitive as a practical sieve over sufficiently large ranges.

== Geometric model ==
Generating successive wheels up to $W_3$

At the heart of the sieve of Pritchard is an algorithm for building successive wheels. It has a simple geometric model as follows:

1. Start with a circle of circumference 1 with a mark at 1.
2. To generate the next wheel:
  1. Go around the wheel and find (the distance to) the first mark after 1; call it p.
  2. Create a new circle with p times the circumference of the current wheel.
  3. Roll the current wheel around the new circle, marking it where a mark touches it.
  4. Magnify the current wheel by p and remove the marks that coincide.

For the first 2 iterations it is necessary to continue round the circle until 1 is reached again.

The first circle represents W_{0} = {1}, and successive circles represent wheels W_{1}, W_{2}, …. The animation on the right shows this model in action up to W_{3}.

It is apparent from the model that wheels are symmetric. This is because P_{k} − w is not divisible by one of the first k primes if and only if w is not so divisible. It is possible to exploit this to avoid processing some composites, but at the cost of a more complex algorithm.

== Related sieves ==
Once the wheel in the sieve of Pritchard reaches its maximum size, the remaining operations are equivalent to those performed by Euler's sieve.

The sieve of Pritchard is unique in conflating the set of prime candidates with a dynamic wheel used to speed up the sifting process. But a separate static wheel (as frequently used to speed up the sieve of Eratosthenes) can give an O(log log N) speedup to the latter, or to linear sieves, provided it is large enough (as a function of N). Examples are the use of the largest wheel of length not exceeding √N / log^{2} N to get a version of the sieve of Eratosthenes that takes O(N) additions and requires only O(√N / log log N) bits, and the speedup of the naturally linear sieve of Atkin to get a sublinear optimized version.

Bengalloun found a linear smoothly incremental sieve, i.e., one that (in theory) can run indefinitely and takes a bounded number of operations to increment the current bound N. He also showed how to make it sublinear by adapting the sieve of Pritchard to incrementally build the next dynamic wheel while the current one is being used. Pritchard showed how to avoid multiplications, thereby obtaining the same asymptotic bit-complexity as the sieve of Pritchard.

Runciman provides a functional algorithm inspired by the sieve of Pritchard.

== See also ==
- Sieve of Eratosthenes
- Sieve of Atkin
- Sieve theory
- Wheel factorization
