= Siwa, Panchthar =

Siwa सिवा
- Location in Nepal
- Coordinates: 27.09°N 87.76°E
- Country: Nepal
- Zone: Mechi Zone
- District: Panchthar District

Population (1991)
  - Total: 3,970
- Time zone: UTC+5:45 (Nepal Time)

Siwa is a market center of Phidim Municipality in Panchthar District in the Mechi Zone in eastern Nepal. It was annexed to Phidim on 18 May 2014 to form the municipality. At the time of the 1991 Nepal census it had a population of 3970.
