= Telugu Naadi (magazine) =

- Founding Editor: V. Chowdary Jampala
- Categories: Community Magazine
- Frequency: Monthly
- First issue: 3 March 2003
- Company: Telugu Naadi Inc.
- Country: United States
- Based in: Cedar Park, Texas
- Language: Telugu
- Website: www.telugunaadi.com
- ISSN: 1559-7008

Telugu Naadi (Telugu: తెలుగు నాది) is an American Telugu-language magazine published in the United States for the Telugu-speaking population. Telugu Naadi, is a general-interest monthly magazine and features the latest on Telugu politics, culture, films, and literature both in India and the United States.

== Publication and circulation ==
Telugu Naadi is published is published from United States with a circulation across 50 states. The magazine has direct operations in New York, New Jersey, Illinois, California, Texas, Florida and Atlanta. The current operating office is in Cedar Park, Texas while the magazines are shipped from San Jose and Chicago simultaneously.

== Staff ==
V. Chowdary Jampala was the Chief Editor from 2004 to 2009 and Vasireddy Naveen is the Managing editor.

== See also ==
- Telugu language policy
