= Shiwa 2000 =

Finnish psychedelic trance group

Shiwa 2000 is a Suomisoundi-style psychedelic trance group from Finland. The regular members of the assemblage are Rick Timebees and Tim Thick, who is also familiar from Texas Faggott and Mandalavandalz. There has also appeared some visiting musicians on the albums of the Shiwa 2000, for example Bill Tema aka MC Vittumeitsi.

The debut album Final Truth 2020 was released by Finnish Karelia Records in 2000. The album has been sold out later on and it has been licensed as a reprint to India. The second album Runkmeditation & Perstantra was released by Russian Hippie Killer Productions in 2006. On April 1, 2010, the final chapter of Shiwa 2000 trilogy, Portinfarttijan Hyppypiertari CD album was released by the Russian label Hippie Killer Productions.

Music of Shiwa 2000 was regularly heard as background and theme music of ATV television channel, a former Helsinki area cable TV channel.

== Discography ==
- Final Truth 2020 (2000)
- Runkmeditation & Perstantra (2006)
- Portinfarttijan Hyppypiertari (2010)
