= Prakash Singh Chib =

British Indian recipient of the Victoria Cross

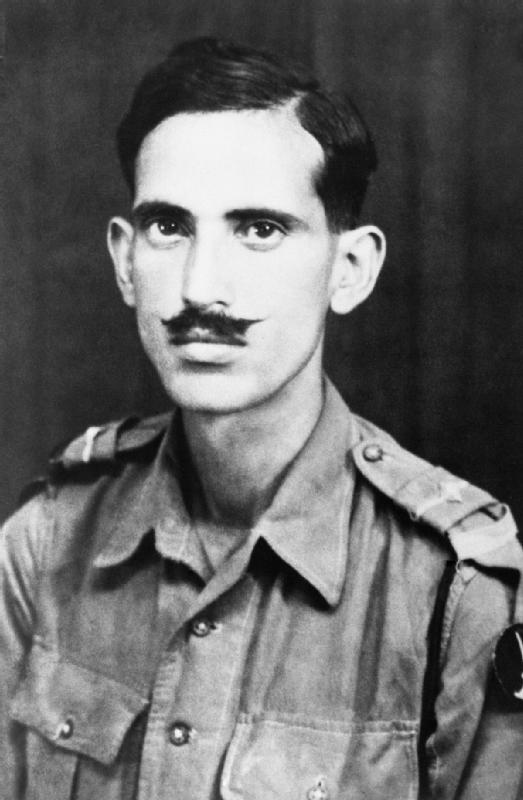
- Born: 1 April 1913; Jammu and Kashmir, Kashmir, British India
- Died: 17 February 1945 (aged 31); British Burma
- Military career
- Allegiance: British India
- Branch: British Indian Army
- Rank: Jemadar
- Units: 14/13th Frontier Force Rifles
- Conflicts: World War II; Pacific War; Burma campaign; Burma campaign (1944–1945) (DOW)
- Awards: Victoria Cross

Prakash Singh Chib VC (1 April 1913 – 17 February 1945) was a British Indian recipient of the Victoria Cross, the highest and most prestigious award for gallantry in the face of the enemy that can be awarded to British and Commonwealth forces.

== Biography ==
Chib was born in Dogra Chib Rajput Family in the Jammu and Kashmir region of the former British India, on 1 April 1913. He was 31 years old, and a Jemadar in the 14th Battalion, 13th Frontier Force Rifles in the Indian Army during World War II when the following deed took place for which he was awarded the Victoria Cross.

On 16/17 February 1945 at Kanlan Ywathit, Burma (now Myanmar), Jemadar Prakash Singh Chib was commanding a platoon which took the main weight of fierce enemy attacks. He was wounded in both ankles and relieved of his command, but when his second-in-command was also wounded, he crawled back and took command of his unit again, directing operations and encouraging his men. He was wounded in both legs a second time but he continued to direct the defense, dragging himself from place to place by his hands. When wounded a third time and final time, he lay shouting the Dogra war-cry, "Jawala Mata Ki Jai! [Glory to Goddess Jawala!]" as he succumbed to his wounds, inspiring his company that finally drove off the enemy.

== Legacy ==
A statue of Singh was built at the village of Nud, Tehsil Akhnoor in Jammu by the Chib Community under the guidance of Raghunath Singh Chib (IAS) of village Deva Batala, Tehsil- Bhimbar, Dist - Mirpur (whose family is in Jammu (India). In his memory, a function is celebrated every year in February. On this date Rs. 100000 (INR) is distributed to war widows (Veer Nariyan). The chairperson of this society is the Major General of 10 Div C/O 56 APO (Indian Army). His family lives in RAJBAG (ujh) KATHUA. His great-grandsons are Surinder Singh Chib and Vivek Chib

== Awards and decorations ==

Victoria Cross	1939–1945 Star	Burma Star	War Medal 1939–1945
