= Siwa (horn) =

Large East-African musical instrument

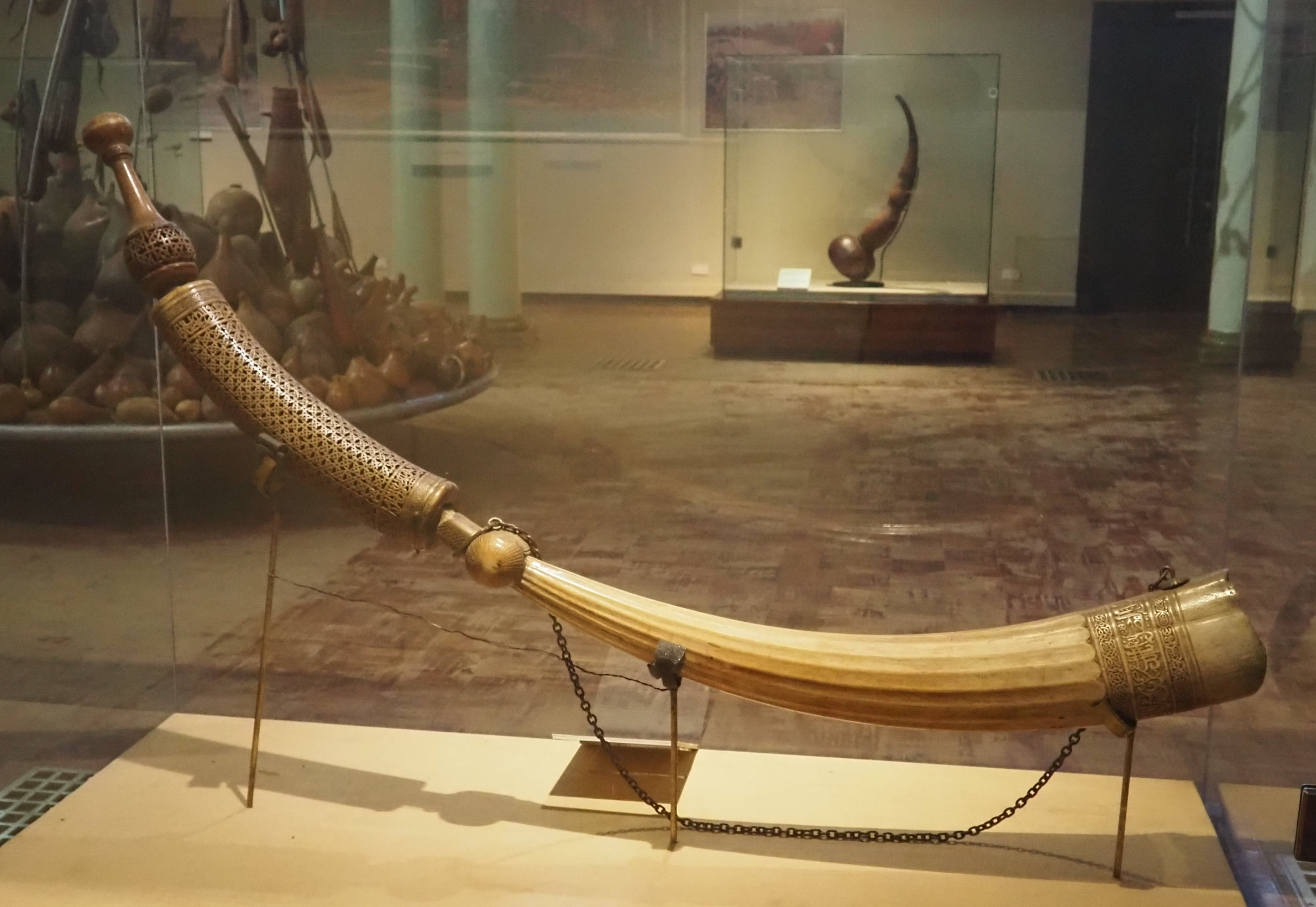
Siwa made from elephant tusk from Pate Island (1688) at the National Museum Nairobi

Siwa is a large ceremonial side-blown horn or bassoon from east Africa, particularly on the coast of Kenya and Tanzania. These horns were owned by local chiefs of Arab descent and were in use in the 17th and early 18th century. They are no longer in use and only a few examples exist in museums including one made from a large elephant tusk in the National Museum of Nairobi. The ivory siwa from Pate Island held at the National Museum in Nairobi measures 2.15 m in length. This siwa came from the princess Mwana Darini, daughter of Sultan of Pate. Most other siwas are smaller and another one made of bronze is held at the Lamu Museum. These horns were owned by royal families and were sounded on special occasions such as the installation of a chief, at royal marriages and at circumcision ceremonies. The copper or bronze parts of the horns were richly decorated with Arabic inscriptions. Side-blown horns were found widely in sub-Saharan Africa. Many were made from antelope horns such as of Kudu and Oryx. Many were looted by the Portuguese by the end of the 17th century.

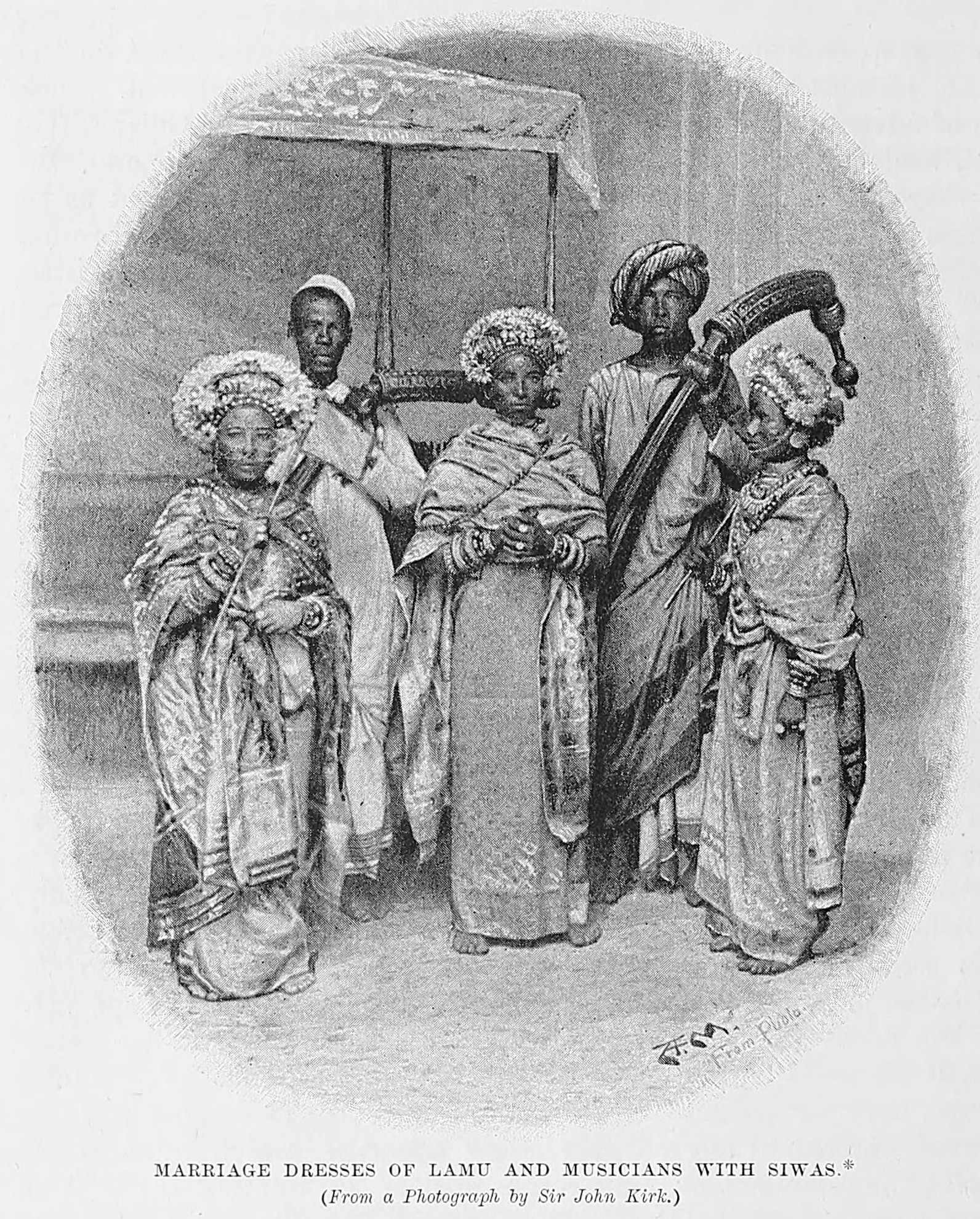
A marriage in Lamu with two Siwa players (from a photo by John Kirk)

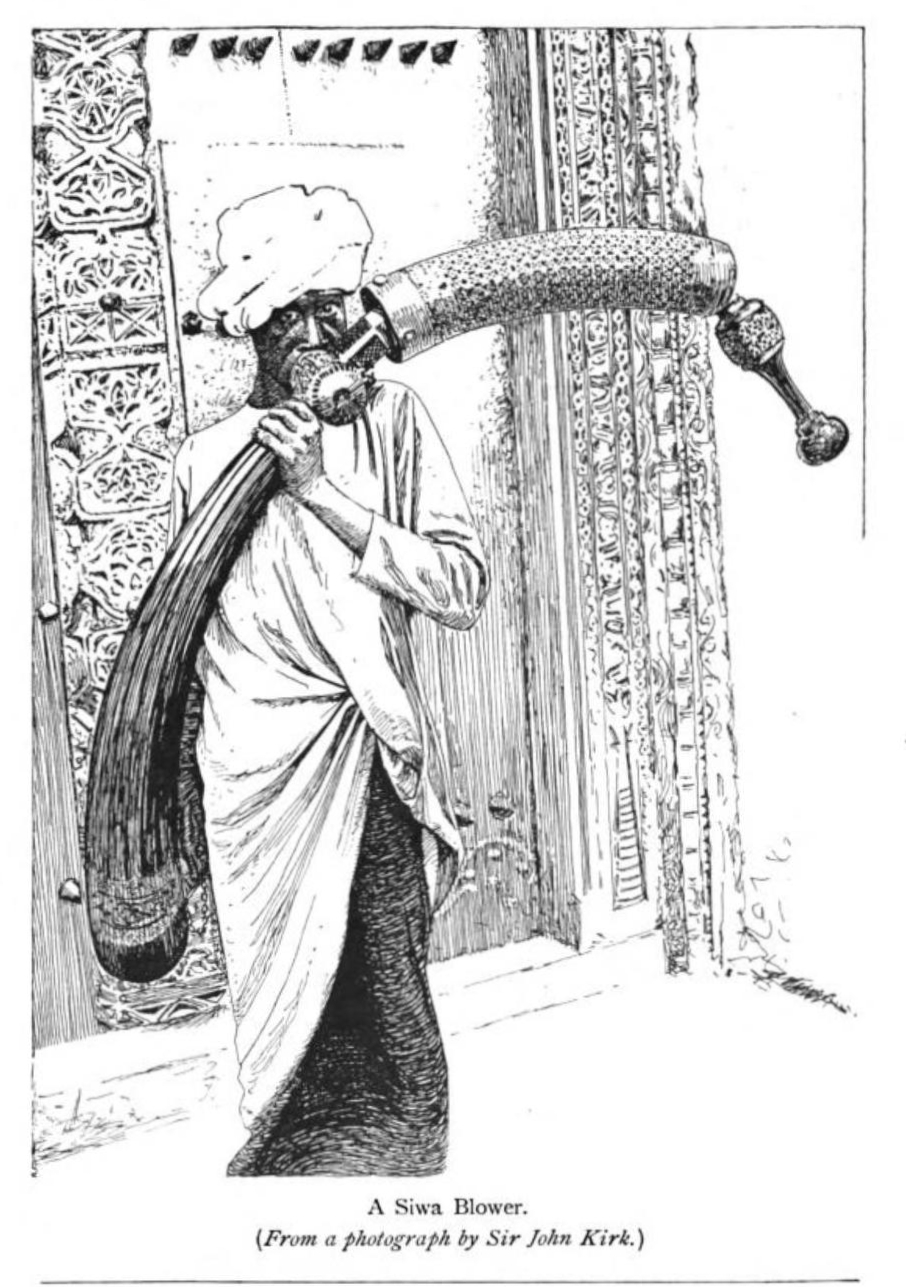
A Siwa in use
