= Community Magazine =

Community Magazine is a Brooklyn-published monthly magazine whose addressed communities are plural: Brooklyn's large Sephardic population, that of Deal, NJ and also Orthodox Ashkenaz readers. Until 2001 its name was Aram Soba newsletter.

== Overview ==
Other Jewish periodicals cite their information as a source.

A list of Jewish periodicals covering USA, UK, Israel and other Jewish population centers, in English, Hebrew, Yiddish, French and other languages: calls it "the most widely circulated Sephardic monthly magazine in the world."

Less than a month before a very close election, The New York Observer described coverage by Community as "they went nuclear."

== Features ==
A multi-page Torah article by Eli Mansour appears monthly. There are other ongoing Halacha items and articles about Jewish History, and understanding science as it interacts with Halacha.
