= Campaign for an Independent Britain =

British eurosceptic campaign group

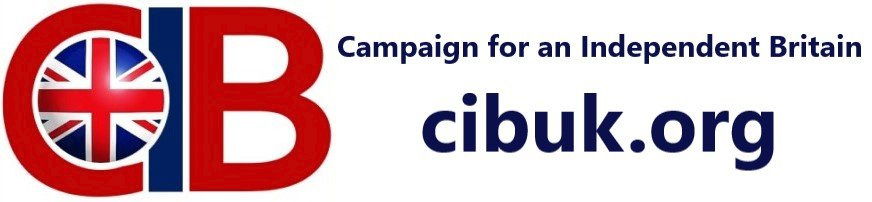
- Founded: 1976
- Type: Campaign group
- Location: London, United Kingdom
- Region served: United Kingdom
- Website: www.cibuk.org

The Campaign for an Independent Britain (CIBUK) is a cross-party UK eurosceptic campaign group that was formed in 1976, and originally known as the Safeguard Britain Campaign. It was formed with the objective of repealing the European Communities Act 1972.
