= 1170 Siva =

Asteroid

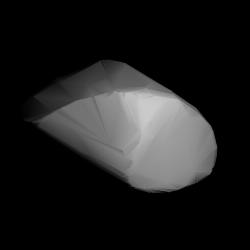
- Modelled shape of Siva from its lightcurve

Discovery
- Discovered by: E. Delporte
- Discovery site: Uccle Obs.
- Discovery date: 29 September 1930

Designations
- Named after: Shiva (Hindu deity)
- Alternative designations: 1930 SQ
- Minor planet category: Mars-crosser; Phocaea

Orbital characteristics
- Epoch 16 February 2017 (JD 2457800.5)
- Uncertainty parameter 0
- Observation arc: 85.19 yr (31,116 days)
- Aphelion: 3.0245 AU
- Perihelion: 1.6291 AU
- Semi-major axis: 2.3268 AU
- Eccentricity: 0.2998
- Orbital period (sidereal): 3.55 yr (1,296 days)
- Mean anomaly: 94.741°
- Mean motion: 0° 16^{m} 39.72^{s} / day
- Inclination: 22.184°
- Longitude of ascending node: 0.9218°
- Argument of perihelion: 59.391°
- Earth MOID: 0.7263 AU
- Mars MOID: 0.3760 AU

Physical characteristics
- Dimensions: 7.68±2.18 km 10.37±0.8 km (IRAS:2); 12.13±0.89 km
- Synodic rotation period: 3.5 h 4.98 h (Note: CALL (2011) web: rotation period 4.98 hours with a brightness amplitude of 0.1 mag. Summary figures at Collaborative Asteroid Lightcurve Link (CALL) for (1170) Siva); 5.22±0.01 h
- Geometric albedo: 0.128±0.020; 0.1751±0.032 (IRAS:2); 0.40±0.16
- Spectral type: B–V = 0.864; U–B = 0.452; Tholen = S · S
- Absolute magnitude (H): 12.00 · 12.18 · 12.43

1170 Siva, provisional designation 1930 SQ, is a stony Phocaea asteroid and large Mars-crosser from the innermost regions of the asteroid belt, approximately 10 kilometers in diameter. It was discovered on 29 September 1930, by Belgian astronomer Eugène Delporte at Uccle Observatory in Belgium, and later named after the Hindu deity Shiva.

== Orbit and classification ==
Siva is a Mars-crossing asteroid, as it crosses the orbit of Mars at 1.666 AU. It is also a member of the Phocaea family (701). It orbits the Sun at a distance of 1.6–3.0 AU once every 3 years and 7 months (1,296 days). Its orbit has an eccentricity of 0.30 and an inclination of 22° with respect to the ecliptic. Siva was first observed at the Japanese Kwasan Observatory, 3 days prior to is discovery. The body's observation arc begins at Uccle, two weeks after its official discovery observation.

== Naming ==
This minor planet is named after Shiva, a Hindu deity often depicted with a third eye on his forehead and with a snake around his neck. Naming citation was first mentioned in The Names of the Minor Planets by Paul Herget in 1955 (H 109).

== Physical characteristics ==
In the Tholen taxonomy, Siva is a stony S-type asteroid.

=== Rotation period ===
Only fragmentary lightcurves of Siva have been obtained since 2001. They gave a rotation period between 3.5 and 5.22 hours with a small change in brightness of 0.04 to 0.1 magnitude (U=1/n.a./1). As of 2017, no secure period has been published.

=== Diameter and albedo ===
According to the surveys carried out by the Infrared Astronomical Satellite IRAS, the Japanese Akari satellite, and NASA's Wide-field Infrared Survey Explorer with its subsequent NEOWISE mission, Siva measures between 7.68 and 12.13 kilometers in diameter, and its surface has an albedo between 0.128 and 0.40. The Collaborative Asteroid Lightcurve Link adopts the results obtained by IRAS, that is, an albedo of 0.1751 and a diameter of 10.37 kilometers with an absolute magnitude of 12.43. Siva belongs to the brightest known Mars-crossers.
