= Siv (given name) =

- Gender: Female
- Name day: 8 March (Sweden); 6 September (Norway)

Origin
- Origin: Norse mythology
- Meaning: Bride
- Region of origin: Scandinavia

Other names
- Related names: Sif, Siff, Siw

Siv is a Scandinavian feminine given name found chiefly in Denmark, Sweden, and Norway. The name derives from the Old Norse word for "bride". In Norse mythology Sif/Siv was the wife of Thor. Individuals bearing the name Siv include:

- Siv Bråten Lunde (born 1960), Norwegian biathlete
- Siv Cedering (1939–2007). Swedish-American poet, writer, and artist
- Siv Ericks (1918–2005), Swedish actress
- Siv Elin Hansen (born 1974), Norwegian politician
- Siv Friðleifsdóttir (born 1962), Icelandic politician
- Siv Gustavsson (born 1957), Swedish racewalking athlete
- Siv Heim Sæbøe (born 1973), Norwegian team handball player
- Siv Holma (1952–2016), Swedish politician
- Siv Henriette Jacobsen (born 1966), Norwegian politician
- Siv Jensen (born 1969), Norwegian politician
- Siv Mossleth (born 1967), Norwegian politician
- Siv Pettersson (1955–1975), Swedish singer
- Siv Stubsveen (born 1968), Norwegian media personality
- Siv Tørudbakken (born 1968), Norwegian politician
- Siv Widerberg (1931–2020), Swedish writer and journalist
