= Živa (mythology) =

Slavic goddess

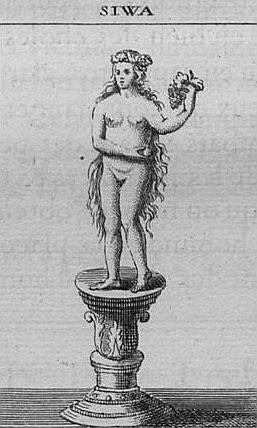
- Siwa from L'Antiquité expliquee... by Bernard de Montfaucon, 1722
- Venerated in: Polabian religion
- Major cult center: Ratzeburg(?)
- Texts: Chronica Slavorum
- Region: Polabia
- Ethnic group: Obotrites

Živa, Zhiva (Latin: Siwa) is a mother goddess of one of the tribes belonging to the Obodritic confederation of the Polabian Slavs. The goddess so appears only in the Chronicle of Helmold of Bozov. He described the strengthening of the pagan cult during the reign of Niklot:

In those days, the multifarious worship of idols and the error of superstition were fortified throughout Slavia. For apart from the sacred forests and the household deities, which abounded in the country and the cities, the most important and preeminent gods were Prone, god of Oldenburg country, Siwa, goddess of the Polabians, and Redigast, god of Obotrite country.

As the tribe's main gord was Ratzeburg, Živa, in one copy of the Chronicle, is called "Goddess of Ratzeburg" (Latin: Raceburgensium Dea).

In copies of the Chronicle, the name is noted as: Siwa (Copenhagen copy), Siwe (Lübeck), Silue (Vienna), Synna (Szczecin). The Copenhagen, Lübeck and Szczecin manuscripts indicate that the name contained the grapheme ⟨w⟩ ([v]); the Szczecin notation was created as a result of frequent ⟨u⟩ → ⟨n⟩ alternation and reflected the form *Syuua, while the double ⟨u⟩ = ⟨w⟩, which indicates the original form *Sywa (*Syva). The Viennese transcript is the most distorted in relation to the original.

Scholars agree on the etymology of this theonym. It is read as the Slavic *Živa, from Slavic feminine adjective *živa "alive, live, living". Živa is also a personal name attested in several Slavic languages, e.g. the Old Polabian personal name *Živa (Latin: Zive, 1336), the Old Polish surname Żywa (Latin: Siwa, Sywa, Szywa, Szyva), the Serbo-Croatian given name Živa, the Bulgarian Zhiva, and others. Originally, therefore, this theonym was a given name, which then became an epithet of an unknown goddess, whose characteristics would have to be related to the meaning of the name; this theonym can be understood as a wishing name, e.g., "may she be alive and live long", or a characterizing name, e.g., "she who is alive". Vyacheslav Ivanov i Vladimir Toporov considered Živa to be an epithet of the goddess Mokosh (which was preserved in the names of the Polabians after Christianization).

== See also ==
- 140 Siwa
