= Sieve of Sundaram =

Algorithm for generating prime numbers

In mathematics, the sieve of Sundaram is a variant of the sieve of Eratosthenes, a simple deterministic algorithm for finding all the prime numbers up to a specified integer. It was discovered by Indian student S. P. Sundaram in 1934.

== Algorithm ==
Sieve of Sundaram: algorithm steps for primes below 202 (unoptimized).

The sieve starts with a list of the integers from 1 to n. From this list, all numbers of the form i + j + 2ij are removed, where i and j are positive integers such that 1 ≤ i ≤ j and i + j + 2ij ≤ n. The remaining numbers are doubled and incremented by one, giving a list of the odd prime numbers (that is, all primes except 2) below 2n + 2.

The sieve of Sundaram sieves out the composite numbers just as the sieve of Eratosthenes does, but even numbers are not considered; the work of "crossing out" the multiples of 2 is done by the final double-and-increment step. Whenever Eratosthenes' method would cross out k different multiples of a prime 2i + 1, Sundaram's method crosses out i + j(2i + 1) for 1 ≤ j ≤ ⌊k/2⌋.

== Correctness ==
If we start with integers from 1 to n, the final list contains only odd integers from 3 to 2n + 1. From this final list, some odd integers have been excluded; we must show these are precisely the composite odd integers less than 2n + 2.

Let q be an odd integer of the form 2k + 1. Then, q is excluded if and only if k is of the form i + j + 2ij, that is q = 2(i + j + 2ij) + 1. Then q = (2i + 1)(2j + 1).

So, an odd integer is excluded from the final list if and only if it has a factorization of the form (2i + 1)(2j + 1) — which is to say, if it has a non-trivial odd factor. Therefore the list must be composed of exactly the set of odd prime numbers less than or equal to 2n + 2.

== Asymptotic complexity ==
def sieve_of_Sundaram(n):
    k = (n - 2) // 2
    integers_list = [True] * (k + 1)
    for i in range(1, k + 1):
        j = i
        while i + j + 2 * i * j <= k:
            integers_list[i + j + 2 * i * j] = False
            j += 1
    if n > 2:
        print(2, end=" ")
    for i in range(1, k + 1):
        if integers_list[i]:
            print(2 * i + 1, end=" ")

The above obscure-but-commonly-implemented{{Citation needed|reason=If this code, which is neither pseudo nor functionally correct, is such a prominent implementation of this algorithm to the point that this false example is to be displayed instead of a functional example, then it should be justified with a source to its origin. |date=June 2026}} Python version of the Sieve of Sundaram hides the true complexity of the algorithm due to the following reasons:

1. The range for the outer i looping variable is much too large, resulting in redundant looping that cannot perform any composite number culling; the proper range is to the array indices that represent odd numbers less than √n.
2. The code does not properly account for indexing of Python arrays, which are zero-based so that it ignores the values at the bottom and top of the array; this is a minor issue, but serves to show that the algorithm behind the code has not been clearly understood.
3. The inner culling loop (the j loop) exactly reflects the way the algorithm is formulated, but seemingly without realizing that the indexed culling starts at exactly the index representing the square of the base odd number and that the indexing using multiplication can much more easily be expressed as a simple repeated addition of the base odd number across the range; in fact, this method of adding a constant value across the culling range is exactly how the Sieve of Eratosthenes culling is generally implemented.

Using Python-as-pseudocode, the following Python code resolves the above issues other than keeping the unused one element that arises from indexing from one-based indexing used with zero-based indexing Python:

from math import isqrt
 
def sieve_of_sundaram_to(limit):
    if limit < 2: return # no primes less than 2

    number_of_culls = 0 # FOR TELEMETRY!!!!!

    # n = (lmt - 2) // 2 + 1 # from "sieves to 2*n + 2; odd numbers up to n" or
    n_index = (limit - 1) // 2 # for one-based array
    array_size = n_index + 1 # so range function includes n

    # NOTE:  the zeroth index representing one is never used!
    maybe_prime = [ True for _ in range(array_size) ]

    # From "Correctness", culling (2 * i + 1) * (2 * j + 1) where 0 < i <= j;
    # then i and j <= (isqrt(limit) - 1) // 2 so
    sqrt_index_size = (isqrt(limit) - 1) // 2 + 1 # include sqrt limit in range
    for i in range(1, sqrt_index_size):
#        if maybe_prime[i]: # ADDING THIS LINE MAKES A SIEVE OF ERATOSTHENES!!!
            vi = 2 * i + 1 # vi will be all odd numbers up to and including n

            # if factors to eliminate are 2*i + 1 and 2*j + 1 where i <= j or
            # vi * (2 * j + 1) or vi * vi, vi * (vi + 2), vi * (vi + 4) ... or
            # culling from vi squared by odd multiples from vi for array_size
            # or using index of (v - 1) // 2...
            for cull_index in range((vi * vi - 1) // 2, array_size, vi):
                maybe_prime[cull_index] = False
                number_of_culls += 1

    print(2) # 2 is the only even prime not handled by the Sieve of Sundaram

    # all unculled values represent odd primes...
    for index in range(1, array_size):
        if maybe_prime[index]: print(2 * index + 1)

    print(f"Number of culls: {number_of_culls:,}.")

The commented-out line is all that is necessary to convert the Sieve of Sundaram to the Odds-Only Sieve of Eratosthenes; this clarifies that the only difference between these two algorithms is that the Sieve of Sundaram culls composite numbers using all odd numbers as the base values, whereas the Odds-Only Sieve of Eratosthenes uses only the odd primes as base values, with both ranges of base values bounded to the square root of the range.{{Citation needed|reason=If this code, which is over optimized to the point of reduced readability, is such a prominent implementation of this algorithm to the point that this example is to be displayed instead of a simple and functionally complete example, then it should be justified with a source to its origin. |date=June 2026}}

When run for various ranges, it is immediately clear that while, of course, the resulting count of primes for a given range is identical between the two algorithms, the number of culling operations is much higher for the Sieve of Sundaram and also grows much more quickly with increasing range.

From the above implementation, it is clear that the amount of work done is given by

$\int_{a}^{b} \frac{n}{2x} \,dx,$

where n is the range to be sieved and the interval [a, b] is the odd numbers between 3 and √n. (The interval [a, b] actually starts at the square of the odd base values, but this difference is negligible for large ranges.)

As the integral of the reciprocal of x is exactly log(x), and as the lower value for a is relatively very small (close to 1, whose logarithm is 0), this is about

$\frac{n}{8} \log(n).$

Ignoring the constant factor of 1/8, the asymptotic complexity is clearly O(n log(n)).

== See also ==
- Sieve of Eratosthenes
- Sieve of Atkin
- Sieve theory
