= Sequences (book) =

Mathematical monograph

H. Halberstam and K.F. Roth: Sequences
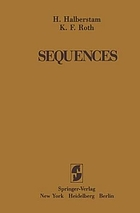
- H. Halberstam and K.F. Roth: Sequences 2nd ed., Springer, New York, Heidelberg, Berlin, 1983.
- Author: H. Halberstam and K.F. Roth
- Publisher: Clarendon Press 1st edition; Springer, New York, 2nd edition.
- English publication date: 1966 1st edition; 1983 2nd edition.
- ISBN: 9781461382294 2nd edition.
- OCLC: 877577079 1st edition; 7330436683 2nd edition.

Sequences is a mathematical monograph on integer sequences. It was written by Heini Halberstam and Klaus Roth, published in 1966 by the Clarendon Press, and republished in 1983 with minor corrections by Springer-Verlag. Although planned to be part of a two-volume set, the second volume was never published.

== Topics ==
The book has five chapters, each largely self-contained and loosely organized around different techniques used to solve problems in this area, with an appendix on the background material in number theory needed for reading the book. Rather than being concerned with specific sequences such as the prime numbers or square numbers, its topic is the mathematical theory of sequences in general.

The first chapter considers the natural density of sequences, and related concepts such as the Schnirelmann density. It proves theorems on the density of sumsets of sequences, including Mann's theorem that the Schnirelmann density of a sumset is at least the sum of the Schnirelmann densities and Kneser's theorem on the structure of sequences whose lower asymptotic density is subadditive. It studies essential components, sequences that when added to another sequence of Schnirelmann density between zero and one, increase their density, proves that additive bases are essential components, and gives examples of essential components that are not additive bases.

The second chapter concerns the number of representations of the integers as sums of a given number of elements from a given sequence, and includes the Erdős–Fuchs theorem according to which this number of representations cannot be close to a linear function. The third chapter continues the study of numbers of representations, using the probabilistic method; it includes the theorem that there exists an additive basis of order two whose number of representations is logarithmic, later strengthened to all orders in the Erdős–Tetali theorem.

After a chapter on sieve theory and the large sieve (unfortunately missing significant developments that happened soon after the book's publication), the final chapter concerns primitive sequences of integers, sequences like the prime numbers in which no element is divisible by another. It includes Behrend's theorem that such a sequence must have logarithmic density zero, and the seemingly-contradictory construction by Abram Samoilovitch Besicovitch of primitive sequences with natural density close to 1/2. It also discusses the sequences that contain all integer multiples of their members, the Davenport–Erdős theorem according to which the lower natural and logarithmic density exist and are equal for such sequences, and a related construction of Besicovitch of a sequence of multiples that has no natural density.

== Audience and reception ==
This book is aimed at other mathematicians and students of mathematics; it is not suitable for a general audience. However, reviewer J. W. S. Cassels suggests that it could be accessible to advanced undergraduates in mathematics.

Reviewer E. M. Wright notes the book's "accurate scholarship", "most readable exposition", and "fascinating topics". Reviewer Marvin Knopp describes the book as "masterly", and as the first book to overview additive combinatorics. Similarly, although Cassels notes the existence of material on additive combinatorics in the books Additive Zahlentheorie (Ostmann, 1956) and Addition Theorems (Mann, 1965), he calls this "the first connected account" of the area, and reviewer Harold Stark notes that much of material covered by the book is "unique in book form". Knopp also praises the book for, in many cases, correcting errors or deficiencies in the original sources that it surveys. Reviewer Harold Stark writes that the book "should be a standard reference in this area for years to come".
