= Felix Behrend =

German mathematician (1911–1962)

Felix Adalbert Behrend
- Born: April 23, 1911; Charlottenburg, Germany
- Died: May 27, 1962 (aged 51); Richmond, Victoria
- Citizenship: German
- Education: Humboldt University of Berlin
- Known for: combinatorics, number theory, and topology
- Scientific career
- Fields: Mathematician

Felix Adalbert Behrend (23 April 1911 – 27 May 1962) was a German mathematician of Jewish descent who escaped Nazi Germany and settled in Australia. His research interests included combinatorics, number theory, and topology. Behrend's theorem and Behrend sequences are named after him.

== Life ==
Behrend was born on 23 April 1911 in Charlottenburg, a suburb of Berlin. He was one of four children of Dr. Felix W. Behrend, a politically liberal mathematics and physics teacher. Although of Jewish descent, their family was Lutheran. Behrend followed his father in studying both mathematics and physics, both at Humboldt University of Berlin and the University of Hamburg, and completed a doctorate in 1933 at Humboldt University. His dissertation, Über numeri abundantes [On abundant numbers] was supervised by Erhard Schmidt.

With Adolf Hitler's rise to power in 1933, Behrend's father lost his job, and Behrend himself moved to Cambridge University in England to work with Harold Davenport and G. H. Hardy. After taking work with a life insurance company in Zürich in 1935 he was transferred to Prague, where he earned a habilitation at Charles University in 1938 while continuing to work as an actuary. He left Czechoslovakia in 1939, just before the war reached that country, and returned through Switzerland to England, but was deported on the HMT Dunera to Australia as an enemy alien in 1940.

Although both Hardy and J. H. C. Whitehead intervened for an early release, he remained in the prison camps in Australia, teaching mathematics there to the other internees. After Thomas MacFarland Cherry added to the calls for his release, he gained his freedom in 1942 and began working at the University of Melbourne. He remained there for the rest of the career, and married a Hungarian dance teacher in 1945 in the Queen's College chapel; they had two children. Although his highest rank was associate professor, Bernhard Neumann writes that "he would have been made a (personal) professor" if not for his untimely death. He died of brain cancer on 27 May 1962 in Richmond, Victoria, a suburb of Melbourne.

== Contributions ==
Behrend's work covered a wide range of topics, and often consisted of "a new approach to questions already deeply studied".

He began his research career in number theory, publishing three papers by the age of 23. His doctoral work provided upper and lower bounds on the density of the abundant numbers. He also provided elementary bounds on the prime number theorem, before that problem was solved more completely by Paul Erdős and Atle Selberg in the late 1940s. He is known for his results in combinatorial number theory, and in particular for Behrend's theorem on the logarithmic density of sets of integers in which no member of the set is a multiple of any other,^{[A]} and for his construction of large Salem–Spencer sets of integers with no three-element arithmetic progression.^{[B]} Behrend sequences are sequences of integers whose multiples have density one; they are named for Behrend, who proved in 1948 that the sum of reciprocals of such a sequence must diverge.^{[C]}

He wrote one paper in algebraic geometry, on the number of symmetric polynomials needed to construct a system of polynomials without nontrivial real solutions, several short papers on mathematical analysis, and an investigation of the properties of geometric shapes that are invariant under affine transformations. After moving to Melbourne his interests shifted to topology, first in the construction of polyhedral models of manifolds, and later in point-set topology.

He was also the author of a posthumously-published children's book, Ulysses' Father (1962), consisting of a collection of bedtime stories linked through the Greek legend of Sisyphus.

== Selected publications ==
| A. | Behrend, Felix (January 1935), "On sequences of numbers not divisible one by another", Journal of the London Mathematical Society, s1-10 (1): 42–44, doi:10.1112/jlms/s1-10.37.42 |

| B. | Behrend, F. A. (December 1946), "On sets of integers which contain no three terms in arithmetical progression", Proceedings of the National Academy of Sciences, 32 (12): 331–332, Bibcode:1946PNAS...32..331B, doi:10.1073/pnas.32.12.331, PMC 1078964, PMID 16578230 |

| C. | Behrend, F. A. (August 1948), "Generalization of an inequality of Heilbronn and Rohrbach", Bulletin of the American Mathematical Society, 54 (8): 681–684, doi:10.1090/S0002-9904-1948-09056-5, MR 0026081 |
