= Hasse–Davenport relation =

Two identities for Gauss sums

The Hasse–Davenport relations, introduced by Davenport and Hasse (1935), are two related identities for Gauss sums, one called the Hasse–Davenport lifting relation, and the other called the Hasse–Davenport product relation. The Hasse–Davenport lifting relation is an equality in number theory relating Gauss sums over different fields. Weil (1949) used it to calculate the zeta function of a Fermat hypersurface over a finite field, which motivated the Weil conjectures.

Gauss sums are analogues of the gamma function over finite fields, and the Hasse–Davenport product relation is the analogue of Gauss's multiplication formula

$$\Gamma(z) \; \Gamma\left(z + \frac{1}{k}\right) \; \Gamma\left(z + \frac{2}{k}\right) \cdots
\Gamma\left(z + \frac{k-1}{k}\right) =
(2 \pi)^{ \frac{k-1}{2}} \; k^{1/2 - kz} \; \Gamma(kz). \,\!$$

In fact the Hasse–Davenport product relation follows from the analogous multiplication formula for p-adic gamma functions together with the Gross–Koblitz formula of Gross & Koblitz (1979).

== Hasse–Davenport lifting relation ==
Let F be a finite field with q elements, and F_{s} be the field such that [F_{s}:F] = s, that is, s is the dimension of the vector space F_{s} over F.

Let $\alpha$ be an element of $F_s$.

Let $\chi$ be a multiplicative character from F to the complex numbers.

Let $N_{F_s/F}(\alpha)$ be the norm from $F_s$ to $F$ defined by

$$N_{F_s/F}(\alpha):=\alpha\cdot\alpha^q\cdots\alpha^{q^{s-1}}.\,$$

Let $\chi'$ be the multiplicative character on $F_s$ which is the composition of $\chi$ with the norm from F_{s} to F, that is

$$\chi'(\alpha):=\chi(N_{F_s/F}(\alpha))$$

Let ψ be some nontrivial additive character of F, and let $\psi'$ be the additive character on $F_s$ which is the composition of $\psi$ with the trace from F_{s} to F, that is

$$\psi'(\alpha):=\psi(Tr_{F_s/F}(\alpha))$$

Let

$$\tau(\chi,\psi)=\sum_{x\in F}\chi(x)\psi(x)$$

be the Gauss sum over F, and let $\tau(\chi',\psi')$ be the Gauss sum over $F_s$.

Then the Hasse–Davenport lifting relation states that

$$(-1)^s\cdot \tau(\chi,\psi)^s=-\tau(\chi',\psi').$$

== Hasse–Davenport product relation ==
The Hasse–Davenport product relation states that

$$\prod_{a\bmod m} \tau(\chi\rho^a,\psi) = -\chi^{-m}(m)\tau(\chi^m,\psi)\prod_{a\bmod m} \tau(\rho^a,\psi)$$

where ρ is a multiplicative character of exact order m dividing q–1 and χ is any multiplicative character and ψ is a non-trivial additive character.
