= Chowla–Selberg formula =

Evaluates a certain product of values of the Gamma function at rational values

In mathematics, the Chowla–Selberg formula is the evaluation of a certain product of values of the gamma function at rational values in terms of values of the Dedekind eta function at imaginary quadratic irrational numbers. The result was essentially found by Lerch (1897) and rediscovered by Chowla and Selberg (1949, 1967).

== Statement ==
In logarithmic form, the Chowla–Selberg formula states that in certain cases the sum

$$\frac{w}{4}\sum_r \chi(r)\log \Gamma\left( \frac{r}{D} \right) = \frac{h}{2}\log(4\pi\sqrt{|D|})
+\sum_\tau\log\left(\sqrt{\Im(\tau)}|\eta(\tau)|^2\right)$$

can be evaluated using the Kronecker limit formula. Here χ is the quadratic residue symbol modulo D, where −D is the discriminant of an imaginary quadratic field. The sum is taken over 0 < r < D, with the usual convention χ(r) = 0 if r and D have a common factor. The function η is the Dedekind eta function, and h is the class number, and w is the number of roots of unity.

== Origin and applications ==
The origin of such formulae is now seen to be in the theory of complex multiplication, and in particular in the theory of periods of an abelian variety of CM-type. This has led to much research and generalization. In particular there is an analog of the Chowla–Selberg formula for p-adic numbers, involving a p-adic gamma function, called the Gross–Koblitz formula.

The Chowla–Selberg formula gives a formula for a finite product of values of the eta functions. By combining this with the theory of complex multiplication, one can give a formula for the individual absolute values of the eta function as

$$\Im(\tau)|\eta(\tau)|^4 = \frac{\alpha}{4\pi\sqrt{|D|}} \prod_r\Gamma(r/|D|)^{\chi(r)\frac{w}{2h}}$$

for some algebraic number α.

== Examples ==
Using Euler's reflection formula for the gamma function gives:

- $\eta(i) = 2^{-1}\pi^{-3/4}\Gamma(\tfrac{1}{4})$

== See also ==
- Multiplication theorem
