= George Leo Watson =

British mathematician (1909–1988)

George Leo Watson (13 December 1909 – 9 January 1988, London) was a British mathematician, who specialized in number theory.

== Education and career ==
Born in Whitby, Watson matriculated at Trinity College, Cambridge in 1927, where he was tutored in mathematics by S. Pollard and A. S. Besicovitch. After graduating in 1930 he went to India as a member of the Indian Civil Service, serving as a District Commissioner in Nagpur. There he spent his leisure time studying the number theory books of Leonard Dickson and began to work on research in number theory. After India's independence he returned to England and taught at South London's Acton Technical College (later a part of Brunel University). In 1951 he attracted the attention of professional mathematicians with a new proof of the seven cubes theorem; Watson's proof was considerably simpler than the 1943 proof by Yuri Linnik. (The seven cubes theorem states that every sufficiently large positive integer is the sum of seven cubes; see Waring's problem.) Harold Davenport helped Watson get a job as a Lecturer at University College London and served as the doctoral advisor for Watson's 1953 thesis Some topics in number theory. At University College London, Watson became in 1961 in a Reader and in 1970 a Professor, then retired in 1977 as Professor Emeritus.

In 1968 Watson was awarded the Senior Berwick Prize of the London Mathematical Society (LMS) for three of his papers on number theory: Diophantine equations reducible to quadratics (1967), Non-homogeneous cubic equations (1967), and Asymmetric inequalities for indefinite quadratic forms (1968).

== Selected publications ==
- Watson, G. L (1953). "On indefinite quadratic forms in five variables". Proceedings of the London Mathematical Society. 3 (1): 170–181. doi:10.1112/plms/s3-3.1.170.
- Watson, G. L (1954). "The representation of integers by positive ternary quadratic forms". Mathematika. 1 (2): 104–110. doi:10.1112/S0025579300000589.
- Watson, G. L. (1960). "Indefinite quadratic polynomials". Mathematika. 7 (2): 141–144. doi:10.1112/S0025579300001698. S2CID 121083296.
- Integral quadratic forms. Cambridge Tracts in Mathematics and Mathematical Physics, No. 51. Cambridge. 1960.
- Watson, G. L (1962). "Transformations of a Quadratic Form Which Do Not Increase the Class‐Number". Proceedings of the London Mathematical Society. 3 (1): 577–587. doi:10.1112/plms/s3-12.1.577.
- Watson, G. L. (1971). The number of minimum points of a positive quadratic form. Warszawa: Instytut Matematyczny Polskiej Akademi Nauk.
- Watson, G. L. (1976). "The 2-adic density of a quadratic form". Mathematika. 23 (1): 94–106. doi:10.1112/s0025579300006197.
- Watson, G. L (1976). "Regular positive ternary quadratic forms". Journal of the London Mathematical Society. 2 (1): 97–102. doi:10.1112/jlms/s2-13.1.97.
