= Multiplication theorem =

Identity obeyed by many special functions related to the gamma function

In mathematics, the multiplication theorem is a certain type of identity obeyed by many special functions related to the gamma function. For the explicit case of the gamma function, the identity is a product of values; thus the name. The various relations all stem from the same underlying principle; that is, the relation for one special function can be derived from that for the others, and is simply a manifestation of the same identity in different guises.

== Finite characteristic ==
The multiplication theorem takes two common forms. In the first case, a finite number of terms are added or multiplied to give the relation. In the second case, an infinite number of terms are added or multiplied. The finite form typically occurs only for the gamma and related functions, for which the identity follows from a p-adic relation over a finite field. For example, the multiplication theorem for the gamma function follows from the Chowla–Selberg formula, which follows from the theory of complex multiplication. The infinite sums are much more common, and follow from characteristic zero relations on the hypergeometric series.

The following tabulates the various appearances of the multiplication theorem for finite characteristic; the characteristic zero relations are given further down. In all cases, n and k are non-negative integers. For the special case of n = 2, the theorem is commonly referred to as the duplication formula.

== Gamma function–Legendre formula ==
The duplication formula and the multiplication theorem for the gamma function are the prototypical examples. The duplication formula for the gamma function is

$$\Gamma(z) \; \Gamma\left(z + \frac{1}{2}\right) = 2^{1-2z} \; \sqrt{\pi} \; \Gamma(2z).$$

It is also called the Legendre duplication formula or Legendre relation, in honor of Adrien-Marie Legendre. The multiplication theorem is

$$\Gamma(z) \; \Gamma\left(z + \frac{1}{k}\right) \; \Gamma\left(z + \frac{2}{k}\right) \cdots
\Gamma\left(z + \frac{k-1}{k}\right) =
(2 \pi)^{ \frac{k-1}{2}} \; k^{\frac{1-2kz}{2} } \; \Gamma(kz)$$

for integer k ≥ 1, and is sometimes called Gauss's multiplication formula, in honour of Carl Friedrich Gauss. The multiplication theorem for the gamma functions can be understood to be a special case, for the trivial Dirichlet character, of the Chowla–Selberg formula.

== Sine function ==
Formally similar duplication formulas hold for the sine function, which are rather simple consequences of the trigonometric identities. Here one has the duplication formula

$$\sin(\pi x)\sin\left(\pi\left(x+\frac{1}{2}\right)\right) = \frac{1}{2}\sin(2\pi x)$$

and, more generally, for any integer k, one has

$$\sin(\pi x)\sin\left(\pi\left(x+\frac{1}{k}\right)\right) \cdots \sin\left(\pi\left(x+\frac{k-1}{k}\right)\right) = 2^{1-k} \sin(k \pi x)$$

== Polygamma function, harmonic numbers ==
The polygamma function is the logarithmic derivative of the gamma function, and thus, the multiplication theorem becomes additive, instead of multiplicative:

$$k^{m} \psi^{(m-1)}(kz) = \sum_{n=0}^{k-1}
\psi^{(m-1)}\left(z+\frac{n}{k}\right)$$

for $m>1$, and, for $m=1$, one has the digamma function:

$$k\left[\psi(kz)-\log(k)\right] = \sum_{n=0}^{k-1}
\psi\left(z+\frac{n}{k}\right).$$

The polygamma identities can be used to obtain a multiplication theorem for harmonic numbers.

== Hurwitz zeta function ==
The Hurwitz zeta function generalizes the polygamma function to non-integer orders, and thus obeys a very similar multiplication theorem:

$$k^s\zeta(s)=\sum_{n=1}^k \zeta\left(s,\frac{n}{k}\right),$$

where $\zeta(s)$ is the Riemann zeta function. This is a special case of

$$k^s\,\zeta(s,kz)= \sum_{n=0}^{k-1}\zeta\left(s,z+\frac{n}{k}\right)$$

and

$$\zeta(s,kz)=\sum^{\infty}_{n=0} {s+n-1 \choose n} (1-k)^n z^n \zeta(s+n,z).$$

Multiplication formulas for the non-principal characters may be given in the form of Dirichlet L-functions.

== Periodic zeta function ==
The periodic zeta function is sometimes defined as

$$F(s;q) = \sum_{m=1}^\infty \frac {e^{2\pi imq}}{m^s}
=\operatorname{Li}_s\left(e^{2\pi i q} \right)$$

where Li_{s}(z) is the polylogarithm. It obeys the duplication formula

$$2^{1-s} F(s;q) = F\left(s,\frac{q}{2}\right)
+ F\left(s,\frac{q+1}{2}\right).$$

As such, it is an eigenvector of the Bernoulli operator with eigenvalue 2^{1−s}. The multiplication theorem is

$$k^{1-s} F(s;kq) = \sum_{n=0}^{k-1} F\left(s,q+\frac{n}{k}\right).$$

The periodic zeta function occurs in the reflection formula for the Hurwitz zeta function, which is why the relation that it obeys, and the Hurwitz zeta relation, differ by the interchange of s → 1−s. Note that the name "periodic" is entirely misleading: although the definition is written so as to appear to be periodic, the actual analytic structure is quite complicated, possessing multiple branch cuts and a complicated monodromy.

The Bernoulli polynomials may be obtained as a limiting case of the periodic zeta function, taking s to be an integer, and thus the multiplication theorem there can be derived from the above. Similarly, substituting q = log z leads to the multiplication theorem for the polylogarithm.

== Polylogarithm ==
The duplication formula takes the form

$$2^{1-s}\operatorname{Li}_s(z^2) = \operatorname{Li}_s(z)+\operatorname{Li}_s(-z).$$

The general multiplication formula is in the form of a Gauss sum or discrete Fourier transform:

$$k^{1-s} \operatorname{Li}_s(z^k) =
\sum_{n=0}^{k-1}\operatorname{Li}_s\left(ze^{i2\pi n/k}\right).$$

These identities follow from that on the periodic zeta function, taking z = log q.

== Kummer's function ==
The duplication formula for Kummer's function is

$$2^{1-n}\Lambda_n(-z^2) = \Lambda_n(z)+\Lambda_n(-z)$$

and thus resembles that for the polylogarithm, but twisted by i.

== Bernoulli polynomials ==
For the Bernoulli polynomials, the multiplication theorems were given by Joseph Ludwig Raabe in 1851:

$$k^{1-m} B_m(kx)=\sum_{n=0}^{k-1} B_m \left(x+\frac{n}{k}\right)$$

and for the Euler polynomials,

$$k^{-m} E_m(kx)= \sum_{n=0}^{k-1}
(-1)^n E_m \left(x+\frac{n}{k}\right)
\quad \mbox{ for } k=1,3,\dots$$

and

$$k^{-m} E_m(kx)= \frac{-2}{m+1} \sum_{n=0}^{k-1}
(-1)^n B_{m+1} \left(x+\frac{n}{k}\right)
\quad \mbox{ for } k=2,4,\dots.$$

The Bernoulli polynomials may be obtained as a special case of the Hurwitz zeta function, and thus the identities follow from there.

== Bernoulli map ==
The Bernoulli map is a certain simple model of a dissipative dynamical system, describing the effect of a shift operator on an infinite string of coin-flips (the Cantor set). The Bernoulli map is a one-sided version of the closely related Baker's map. The Bernoulli map generalizes to a k-adic version, which acts on infinite strings of k symbols: this is the Bernoulli scheme. The transfer operator $\mathcal{L}_k$ corresponding to the shift operator on the Bernoulli scheme is given by

$$[\mathcal{L}_k f](x) = \frac{1}{k}\sum_{n=0}^{k-1}f\left(\frac{x+n}{k}\right)$$

Perhaps not surprisingly, the eigenvectors of this operator are given by the Bernoulli polynomials. That is, one has that

$$\mathcal{L}_k B_m = \frac{1}{k^m}B_m$$

It is the fact that the eigenvalues $k^{-m}<1$ that marks this as a dissipative system: for a non-dissipative measure-preserving dynamical system, the eigenvalues of the transfer operator lie on the unit circle.

One may construct a function obeying the multiplication theorem from any totally multiplicative function. Let $f(n)$ be totally multiplicative; that is, $f(mn)=f(m)f(n)$ for any integers m, n. Define its Fourier series as

$$g(x)=\sum_{n=1}^\infty f(n) \exp(2\pi inx)$$

Assuming that the sum converges, so that g(x) exists, one then has that it obeys the multiplication theorem; that is, that

$$\frac{1}{k}\sum_{n=0}^{k-1}g\left(\frac{x+n}{k}\right)=f(k)g(x)$$

That is, g(x) is an eigenfunction of Bernoulli transfer operator, with eigenvalue f(k). The multiplication theorem for the Bernoulli polynomials then follows as a special case of the multiplicative function $f(n)=n^{-s}$. Completely multiplicative functions are determined entirely by their values on the prime numbers; thus, any sequence whatsoever, as long as the Fourier series converges, will generate a function that obeys the multiplication theorem.

== Characteristic zero ==
The multiplication theorem over a field of characteristic zero does not close after a finite number of terms, but requires an infinite series to be expressed. Examples include that for the Bessel function $J_\nu(z)$:

$$\lambda^{-\nu} J_\nu (\lambda z) =
\sum_{n=0}^\infty \frac{1}{n!}
\left(\frac{(1-\lambda^2)z}{2}\right)^n
J_{\nu+n}(z),$$

where $\lambda$ and $\nu$ may be taken as arbitrary complex numbers. Such characteristic-zero identities follow generally from one of many possible identities on the hypergeometric series.
