= Gross–Koblitz formula =

Expresses a Gauss sum using a product of values of the p-adic gamma function

In mathematics, the Gross–Koblitz formula, introduced by Gross and Koblitz (1979) expresses a Gauss sum using a product of values of the p-adic gamma function. It is an analog of the Chowla–Selberg formula for the usual gamma function. It implies the Hasse–Davenport relation and generalizes the Stickelberger theorem. Boyarsky (1980) gave another proof of the Gross–Koblitz formula ("Boyarsky" being a pseudonym of Bernard Dwork), and Robert (2001) gave an elementary proof.

== Statement ==
The Gross–Koblitz formula states that the Gauss sum $\tau$ can be given in terms of the $p$-adic gamma function $\Gamma_p$ by

$$\tau_q(r) = -\pi^{s_p(r)}\prod_{0\leq i <f}\Gamma_p\!\left(\frac{r^{(i)}}{q-1} \right)$$

where

- $q$ is a power $p^f$ of a prime $p$,
- $r$ is an integer with $0 \leq r < q-1$,
- $r^{(i)}$ is the integer whose base-$p$ expansion is a cyclic permutation of the $f$ digits of $r$ by $i$ positions,
- $s_p(r)$ is the sum of the base-$p$ digits of $r$,
- $\tau_q(r) = \sum_{a^{q-1}=1} a^{-r} \zeta_\pi^{\text{Tr}(a)}$, where the sum is over roots of unity in the extension $\mathbb{Q}_p(\pi)$,
- $\pi$ satisfies $\pi^{p - 1} = -p$, and
- $\zeta_\pi$ is the $p$th root of unity congruent to $1 + \pi$ modulo $\pi^2$.
