= Kummer's function =

Mathematical function

In mathematics, Kummer's function, named after Ernst Kummer, is a complex function related to the polylogarithm. It is defined by

$$\Lambda_n(z)=\int_0^z \frac{\log^{n-1}|t|}{1+t}\;dt.$$

Its duplication formula is

$$\Lambda_n(z)+\Lambda_n(-z)= 2^{1-n}\Lambda_n(-z^2)$$.

Compare this to the duplication formula for the polylogarithm:

$$\operatorname{Li}_n(z)+\operatorname{Li}_n(-z)= 2^{1-n}\operatorname{Li}_n(z^2).$$

An explicit link to the polylogarithm is given by

$$\operatorname{Li}_n(z)=\operatorname{Li}_n(1)\;\;+\;\;
\sum_{k=1}^{n-1} (-1)^{k-1} \;\frac{\log^k |z|} {k!} \;\operatorname{Li}_{n-k} (z) \;\;+\;\;
\frac{(-1)^{n-1}}{(n-1)!} \;\left[ \Lambda_n(-1) - \Lambda_n(-z) \right].$$
