= Discrepancy theory =

Theory of irregularities of distribution

In mathematics, discrepancy theory describes the deviation of a situation from the state one would like it to be in. It is also called the theory of irregularities of distribution. This refers to the theme of classical discrepancy theory, namely distributing points in some space such that they are evenly distributed with respect to some (mostly geometrically defined) subsets. The discrepancy (irregularity) measures how far a given distribution deviates from an ideal one.

Discrepancy theory can be described as the study of inevitable irregularities of distributions, in measure-theoretic and combinatorial settings. Just as Ramsey theory elucidates the impossibility of total disorder, discrepancy theory studies the deviations from total uniformity.

A significant event in the history of discrepancy theory was the 1916 paper of Weyl on the uniform distribution of sequences in the unit interval.

== Theorems ==
Discrepancy theory is based on the following classic theorems:

- Geometric discrepancy theory
- The theorem of van Aardenne-Ehrenfest
- Arithmetic progressions (Roth, Sarkozy, Beck, Matousek & Spencer)
- Beck–Fiala theorem
- Six Standard Deviations Suffice (Spencer)

== Major open problems ==
The unsolved problems relating to discrepancy theory include:

- Axis-parallel rectangles in dimensions three and higher (folklore)
- Komlós conjecture
- Heilbronn triangle problem on the minimum area of a triangle determined by three points from an n-point set

== Applications ==
Applications for discrepancy theory include:

- Numerical integration: Monte Carlo methods in high dimensions
- Computational geometry: Divide-and-conquer algorithm
- Image processing: Halftoning
- Random trial formulation: Randomized controlled trial

== See also ==
- Discrepancy of hypergraphs
- Geometric discrepancy theory
