= Harold Davenport =

English mathematician (1907–1969)

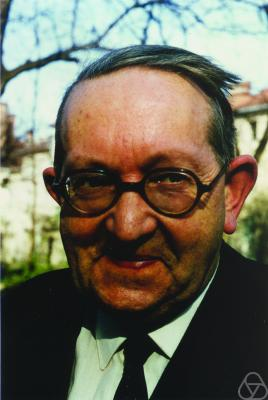
- Davenport in 1968
- Born: 30 October 1907; Huncoat, Lancashire, England
- Died: 9 June 1969 (aged 61); Cambridge, England
- Education: University of Manchester; Trinity College, Cambridge
- Known for: Davenport–Erdős theorem; Davenport–Schinzel sequences; Davenport–Schmidt theorem; Hasse–Davenport relations
- Children: James H. Davenport
- Awards: Rayleigh Prize (1930); Adams Prize (1940); Senior Berwick Prize (1954); Sylvester Medal (1967); Fellow of the Royal Society
- Scientific career
- Fields: Number theory
- Workplaces: University of Manchester; University of Wales; University College London; University of Cambridge
- Doctoral advisor: John Edensor Littlewood
- Doctoral students: John Horton Conway; Alan Baker; Peter Elliott; H. L. Montgomery; Martin Huxley; G. L. Watson

Harold Davenport FRS (30 October 1907 – 9 June 1969) was an English mathematician, known for his extensive work in number theory.

== Early life and education ==
Born on 30 October 1907 in Huncoat, Lancashire, Davenport was educated at Accrington Grammar School, the University of Manchester (graduating in 1927), and Trinity College, Cambridge. He became a research student of John Edensor Littlewood, working on the question of the distribution of quadratic residues.

== First steps in research ==
The attack on the distribution question leads quickly to problems that are now seen to be special cases of those on local zeta-functions, for the particular case of some special hyperelliptic curves such as $Y^2 = X(X-1)(X-2)\ldots (X-k)$.

Bounds for the zeroes of the local zeta-function immediately imply bounds for sums $\sum \chi(X(X-1)(X-2)\ldots (X-k))$, where χ is the Legendre symbol modulo a prime number p, and the sum is taken over a complete set of residues mod p.

In the light of this connection it was appropriate that, with a Trinity research fellowship, Davenport in 1932–1933 spent time in Marburg and Göttingen working with Helmut Hasse, an expert on the algebraic theory. This produced the work on the Hasse–Davenport relations for Gauss sums, and contact with Hans Heilbronn, with whom Davenport would later collaborate. In fact, as Davenport later admitted, his inherent prejudices against algebraic methods ("what can you do with algebra?") probably limited the amount he learned, in particular in the "new" algebraic geometry and Artin/Noether approach to abstract algebra.

He proved in 1946 that 8436 is the largest tetrahedral number of the form $2^a+3^b+1$ for some nonnegative integers $a$ and $b$ and also in 1947 that 5040 is the largest factorial of the form $n(n+4)(n+6)$ for some integer $n$ by using Brun sieve and other advanced methods.

== Later career ==
He took an appointment at the University of Manchester in 1937, just at the time when Louis Mordell had recruited émigrés from continental Europe to build an outstanding department. He moved into the areas of diophantine approximation and geometry of numbers. These were fashionable, and complemented the technical expertise he had in the Hardy–Littlewood circle method; he was later, though, to let drop the comment that he wished he'd spent more time on the Riemann hypothesis.

He was President of the London Mathematical Society from 1957 to 1959. After professorial positions at the University of Wales and University College London, he was appointed to the Rouse Ball Chair of Mathematics in Cambridge in 1958. There he remained until his death, of lung cancer.

== Personal life ==
Davenport married Anne Lofthouse, whom he met at the University College of North Wales at Bangor in 1944; they had two children, Richard and James, the latter going on to become Hebron and Medlock Professor of Information Technology at the University of Bath.

== Influence ==
From about 1950, Davenport was the obvious leader of a "school", somewhat unusually in the context of British mathematics. The successor to the school of mathematical analysis of G. H. Hardy and J. E. Littlewood, it was also more narrowly devoted to number theory, and indeed to its analytic side, as had flourished in the 1930s. This implied problem-solving, and hard-analysis methods. The outstanding works of Klaus Roth and Alan Baker exemplify what this can do, in diophantine approximation. Two reported sayings, "the problems are there", and "I don't care how you get hold of the gadget, I just want to know how big or small it is", sum up the attitude, and could be transplanted today into any discussion of combinatorics. This concrete emphasis on problems stood in sharp contrast with the abstraction of Bourbaki, who were then active just across the English Channel.

== Books ==
- The Higher Arithmetic: An Introduction to the Theory of Numbers (1952)
- Analytic methods for Diophantine equations and Diophantine inequalities (1962); Browning, T. D., ed. (2005). 2nd edition. Cambridge University Press. ISBN 0-521-60583-0.
- Multiplicative number theory (1967)
  - 2nd edition (revised by Hugh L. Montgomery)
- The collected works of Harold Davenport (1977) in four volumes, edited by B. J. Birch, H. Halberstam, C. A. Rogers
