= Heini Halberstam =

British mathematician

- Born: 11 September 1926; Most, Czechoslovakia
- Died: 25 January 2014 (aged 87); Champaign, Illinois, United States
- Citizenship: British
- Education: University College London
- Scientific career
- Fields: Mathematics; Analytic number theory Combinatorial number theory

Heini Halberstam (11 September 1926 – 25 January 2014) was a Czech-born British mathematician, working in the field of analytic number theory. He is remembered in part for the Elliott–Halberstam conjecture from 1968.

== Life and career ==
Halberstam was born in Most, Czechoslovakia and died in Champaign, Illinois, US. His father died when he was very young. After Adolf Hitler's annexation of the Sudetenland, he and his mother moved to Prague. At the age of twelve, as the Nazi occupation progressed, he was one of the 669 children saved by Sir Nicholas Winton, who organized the Kindertransport, a train that allowed those children to leave Nazi-occupied territory. He was sent to England, where he lived during World War II.

He obtained his PhD in 1952, from University College, London, under the supervision of Theodor Estermann. From 1962 until 1964, Halberstam was Erasmus Smith's Professor of Mathematics at Trinity College Dublin; From 1964 until 1980, Halberstam was a Professor of Mathematics at the University of Nottingham. In 1980, he took up a position at the University of Illinois Urbana-Champaign (UIUC) and became an Emeritus Professor at UIUC in 1996. In 2012, he became a fellow of the American Mathematical Society.

He is known also for books, Sequences with Klaus Roth on additive number theory, and with H. E. Richert on sieve theory.
