= József Beck =

Hungarian mathematician

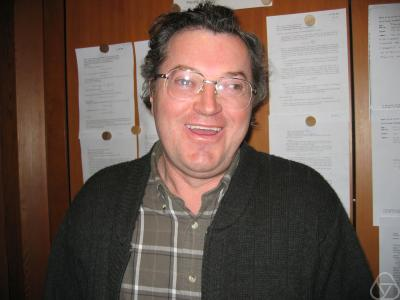
Jozsef Beck in 2004

József Beck (Budapest, Hungary, February 14, 1952) is a Harold H. Martin Professor of Mathematics at Rutgers University.

His contributions to combinatorics include the partial colouring lemma and the Beck–Fiala theorem in discrepancy theory, the algorithmic version of the Lovász local lemma, the two extremes theorem in combinatorial geometry and the second moment method in the theory of positional games, among others.

Beck was awarded the Fulkerson Prize in 1985 for a paper titled "Roth's estimate of the discrepancy of integer sequences is nearly sharp", which introduced the notion of discrepancy on hypergraphs and established an upper bound on the discrepancy of the family of arithmetic progressions contained in {1,2,...,n}, matching the classical lower bound up to a polylogarithmic factor. Jiří Matoušek and Joel Spencer later succeeded in getting rid of this factor, showing that the bound was really sharp.

Beck gave an invited talk at the 1986 International Congress of Mathematicians. He is an external member of the Hungarian Academy of Sciences (2004).

== Books ==
- Irregularities of Distribution (with William W. L. Chen, Cambridge Tracts in Mathematics 89, Cambridge University Press, 1987)
- Combinatorial Games: Tic-Tac-Toe Theory (Encyclopedia of Mathematics and its Applications 114, Cambridge University Press, 2008)
- Inevitable Randomness in Discrete Mathematics (University Lecture Series 49, American Mathematical Society, 2009)
- Probabilistic Diophantine Approximation: Randomness in Lattice Point Counting (Springer Monographs in Mathematics. Springer-Verlag, 2014)
- Strong Uniformity and Large Dynamical Systems (World Scientific Publishing, 2018)
