= Mathematika =

- Discipline: Mathematics
- Language: English
- Edited by: Victor Beresnevich, William Chen, and Alex Sobolev

Publication details
- History: 1954
- Publisher: University College London+London Mathematical Society
- Frequency: Quarterly
- Impact factor: 0.8 (2023)

Standard abbreviations
- ISO 4: Mathematika
- MathSciNet: Mathematika

Indexing
- ISSN: 0025-5793 (print); 2041-7942 (web)
- LCCN: 59047603
- OCLC no.: 369069919

Links
- Journal homepage

Mathematika is a peer-reviewed mathematics journal that publishes both pure and applied mathematical articles. The journal was founded by Harold Davenport in the 1950s. The journal is published by the London Mathematical Society, on behalf of the journal's owner University College London.

== Indexing and abstracting ==
According to the Journal Citation Reports, the journal has a 2023 impact factor of 0.8. The journal is indexed in the following bibliographic databases:

- MathSciNet
- Science Citation Index Expanded
- Web of Science
- Zentralblatt MATH
