= P-adic gamma function =

Mathematical function

In mathematics, the p-adic gamma function Γ_{p} is a function of a p-adic variable analogous to the gamma function. It was first explicitly defined by Morita (1975), though Boyarsky (1980) pointed out that Dwork (1964) implicitly used the same function. Diamond (1977) defined a p-adic analog G_{p} of log Γ. Overholtzer (1952) had previously given a definition of a different p-adic analogue of the gamma function, but his function does not have satisfactory properties and is not used much.

== Definition ==
The p-adic gamma function is the unique continuous function of a p-adic integer x (with values in $\mathbb{Z}_p$) such that

$$\Gamma_p(x) = (-1)^x \prod_{0<i<x,\ p \,\nmid\, i} i$$

for positive integers x, where the product is restricted to integers i not divisible by p. As the positive integers are dense with respect to the p-adic topology in $\mathbb{Z}_p$, $\Gamma_p(x)$ can be extended uniquely to the whole of $\mathbb{Z}_p$. Here $\mathbb{Z}_p$ is the ring of p-adic integers. It follows from the definition that the values of $\Gamma_p(\mathbb{Z})$ are invertible in $\mathbb{Z}_p$; this is because these values are products of integers not divisible by p, and this property holds after the continuous extension to $\mathbb{Z}_p$. Thus $\Gamma_p:\mathbb{Z}_p\to\mathbb{Z}_p^\times$. Here $\mathbb{Z}_p^\times$ is the set of invertible p-adic integers.

== Basic properties of the p-adic gamma function ==
The classical gamma function satisfies the functional equation $\Gamma(x+1) = x\Gamma(x)$ for any $x\in\mathbb{C}\setminus\mathbb{Z}_{\le0}$. This has an analogue with respect to the Morita gamma function:

$$\frac{\Gamma_p(x+1)}{\Gamma_p(x)}=\begin{cases} -x, & \mbox{if } x \in \mathbb{Z}_p^\times  \\ -1,  & \mbox{if } x\in p\mathbb{Z}_p. \end{cases}$$

The Euler's reflection formula $\Gamma(x)\Gamma(1-x) = \frac{\pi}{\sin{(\pi x)}}$ has the following simple counterpart in the p-adic case:

$$\Gamma_p(x)\Gamma_p(1-x) = (-1)^{x_0},$$

where $x_0$ is the first digit in the p-adic expansion of x, unless $x \in p\mathbb{Z}_p$, in which case $x_0 = p$ rather than 0.

== Special values ==
$$\Gamma_p(0)=1,$$
$$\Gamma_p(1)=-1,$$
$$\Gamma_p(2)=1,$$
$$\Gamma_p(3)=-2,$$

and, in general,

$$\Gamma_p(n+1)=\frac{(-1)^{n+1}n!}{[n/p]!p^{[n/p]}}\quad(n\ge2).$$

At $x=\frac12$ the Morita gamma function is related to the Legendre symbol $\left(\frac{a}{p}\right)$:

$$\Gamma_p\left(\frac12\right)^2 = -\left(\frac{-1}{p}\right).$$

It can also be seen, that $\Gamma_p(p^n)\equiv1\pmod{p^n},$ hence $\Gamma_p(p^n)\to1$ as $n\to\infty$.

Other interesting special values come from the Gross–Koblitz formula, which was first proved by cohomological tools, and later was proved using more elementary methods. For example,

$$\Gamma_5\left(\frac14\right)^2=-2+\sqrt{-1},$$
$$\Gamma_7\left(\frac13\right)^3=\frac{1-3\sqrt{-3}}{2},$$

where $\sqrt{-1}\in\mathbb{Z}_5$ denotes the square root with first digit 3, and $\sqrt{-3}\in\mathbb{Z}_7$ denotes the square root with first digit 2. (Such specifications must always be done if we talk about roots.)

Another example is

$$\Gamma_3\left(\frac18\right)\Gamma_3\left(\frac38\right)=-(1+\sqrt{-2}),$$

where $\sqrt{-2}$ is the square root of $-2$ in $\mathbb{Q}_3$ congruent to 1 modulo 3.

== p-adic Raabe formula ==
The Raabe formula for the classical Gamma function says that

$$\int_0^1\log\Gamma(x+t)dt=\frac12\log(2\pi)+x\log x-x.$$

This has an analogue for the Iwasawa logarithm of the Morita gamma function:

$$\int_{\mathbb{Z}_p}\log\Gamma_p(x+t)dt=(x-1)(\log\Gamma_p)'(x)-x+\left\lceil\frac{x}{p}\right\rceil\quad(x\in\mathbb{Z}_p).$$

The ceiling function to be understood as the p-adic limit $\lim_{n\to\infty}\left\lceil\frac{x_n}{p}\right\rceil$ such that $x_n\to x$.

== Mahler expansion ==
The Mahler expansion is similarly important for p-adic functions as the Taylor expansion in classical analysis. The Mahler expansion of the p-adic gamma function is the following:

$$\Gamma_p(x+1)=\sum_{k=0}^\infty a_k\binom{x}{k},$$

where the sequence $a_k$ is defined by the following identity:

$$\sum_{k=0}^\infty(-1)^{k+1}a_k\frac{x^k}{k!}=\frac{1-x^p}{1-x}\exp\left(x+\frac{x^p}{p}\right).$$

== See also ==
- Gross–Koblitz formula
