= Lowest common factor =

Lowest common factor may refer to the following mathematical terms:

- Greatest common divisor, also known as the greatest common factor
- Least common multiple
- Lowest common denominator
