= Schizophrenic number =

Irrational numbers which appear to be rational

A schizophrenic number or mock rational number is an irrational number which displays certain characteristics of rational numbers. It is one of the numerous mathematical curiosities.

== Definition ==
The Universal Book of Mathematics defines "schizophrenic number" as:

An informal name for an irrational number that displays such persistent patterns in its decimal expansion, that it has the appearance of a rational number. A schizophrenic number can be obtained as follows. For any positive integer n, let f (n) denote the integer given by the recurrence f (n) = 10 f (n − 1) + n with the initial value f(0) = 0. Thus, f (1) = 1, f (2) = 12, f (3) = 123, and so on. The square roots of f (n) for odd integers n give rise to a curious mixture appearing to be rational for periods, and then disintegrating into irrationality. This is illustrated by the first 500 digits of √f (49):

1111111111111111111111111.1111111111111111111111 0860
555555555555555555555555555555555555555555555 2730541
66666666666666666666666666666666666666666 0296260347
2222222222222222222222222222222222222 0426563940928819
4444444444444444444444444444444 38775551250401171874
9999999999999999999999999999 808249687711486305338541
66666666666666666666666 5987185738621440638655598958
33333333333333333333 0843460407627608206940277099609374
99999999999999 0642227587555983066639430321587456597
222222222 1863492016791180833081844 ...

The repeating strings become progressively shorter and the scrambled strings become larger until eventually the repeating strings disappear. However, by increasing n we can forestall the disappearance of the repeating strings as long as we like. The repeating digits are always 1, 5, 6, 2, 4, 9, 6, 3, 9, 2, ... .

The sequence of numbers generated by the recurrence relation f (n) = 10 f (n − 1) + n described above is:

0, 1, 12, 123, 1234, 12345, 123456, 1234567, 12345678, 123456789, 1234567900, ... (sequence A014824 in the OEIS).
f(49) = 1234567901234567901234567901234567901234567901229

The integer parts of their square roots,

1, 3, 11, 35, 111, 351, 1111, 3513, 11111, 35136, 111111, 351364, 1111111, ... (sequence A068995 in the OEIS),

alternate between numbers with irregular digits and numbers with repeating digits, in a similar way to the alternations appearing within the decimal part of each square root.

== Characteristics ==
The schizophrenic number shown above is the special case of a more general phenomenon that appears in the $b$-ary expansions of square roots of the solutions of the recurrence $f_b(n)=b f_b(n-1)+n$, for all $b\geq2$, with initial value $f(0) = 0$ taken at odd positive integers $n$. The case $b=10$ and $n=49$ corresponds to the example above.

Indeed, Tóth showed that these irrational numbers present schizophrenic patterns within their $b$-ary expansion, composed of blocks that begin with a non-repeating digit block followed by a repeating digit block. When put together in base $b$, these blocks form the schizophrenic pattern. For instance, in base 8, the number $\sqrt{f_8(49)}$ begins:

1111111111111111111111111.1111111111111111111111 0600
444444444444444444444444444444444444444444444 02144
333333333333333333333333333333333333333333 175124422
666666666666666666666666666666666666666 ....

The pattern is due to the Taylor expansion of the square root of the recurrence's solution taken at odd positive integers. The various digit contributions of the Taylor expansion yield the non-repeating and repeating digit blocks that form the schizophrenic pattern.

== Other properties ==
In some cases, instead of repeating digit sequences, we find repeating digit patterns. For instance, the number $\sqrt{f_3(49)}$:

1111111111111111111111111.1111111111111111111111111111111 01200 
202020202020202020202020202020202020202020 11010102 
00120012000012001200120012001200120012 0010
21120020211210002112100021121000211210 ...

shows repeating digit patterns in base $3$.

Numbers that are schizophrenic in base $b$ are also schizophrenic in base $b^m$, up to a certain limit (see Tóth). An example is $\sqrt{f_3(49)}$ above, which is still schizophrenic in base $9$:

1444444444444.4444444444 350
666666666666666666666 4112
0505050505050505050 337506
75307530753075307 40552382 ...

== History ==
Clifford A. Pickover has said that the schizophrenic numbers were discovered by Kevin Brown. In Wonders of Numbers Pickover described the history of schizophrenic numbers thus:

The construction and discovery of schizophrenic numbers was prompted by a claim (posted in the Usenet newsgroup sci.math) that the digits of an irrational number chosen at random would not be expected to display obvious patterns in the first 100 digits. It was said that if such a pattern were found, it would be irrefutable proof of the existence of either God or extraterrestrial intelligence. (An irrational number is any number that cannot be expressed as a ratio of two integers. Transcendental numbers like e and π, and noninteger surds such as square root of 2 are irrational.)

== See also ==
- Almost integer
- Normal number
- Six nines in pi
