= Mathematical joke =

Humor about mathematics or mathematicians

A cheesy joke using pizza to demonstrate volume and mass of a cylindrical object with radius z, height a, and density e^{ir}

A mathematical joke is a form of humor that relies on aspects of mathematics or a stereotype of mathematicians. The humor may come from a pun, or from a double meaning of a mathematical term, or from a misunderstanding of a mathematical concept. Mathematician and author John Allen Paulos, in his book Mathematics and Humor, described several ways that mathematics, generally considered a dry, formal activity, overlaps with humor, a loose, irreverent activity: both are forms of "intellectual play"; both have "logic, pattern, rules, structure"; and both are "economical and explicit".

Some performers combine mathematics and jokes to entertain and/or teach math.

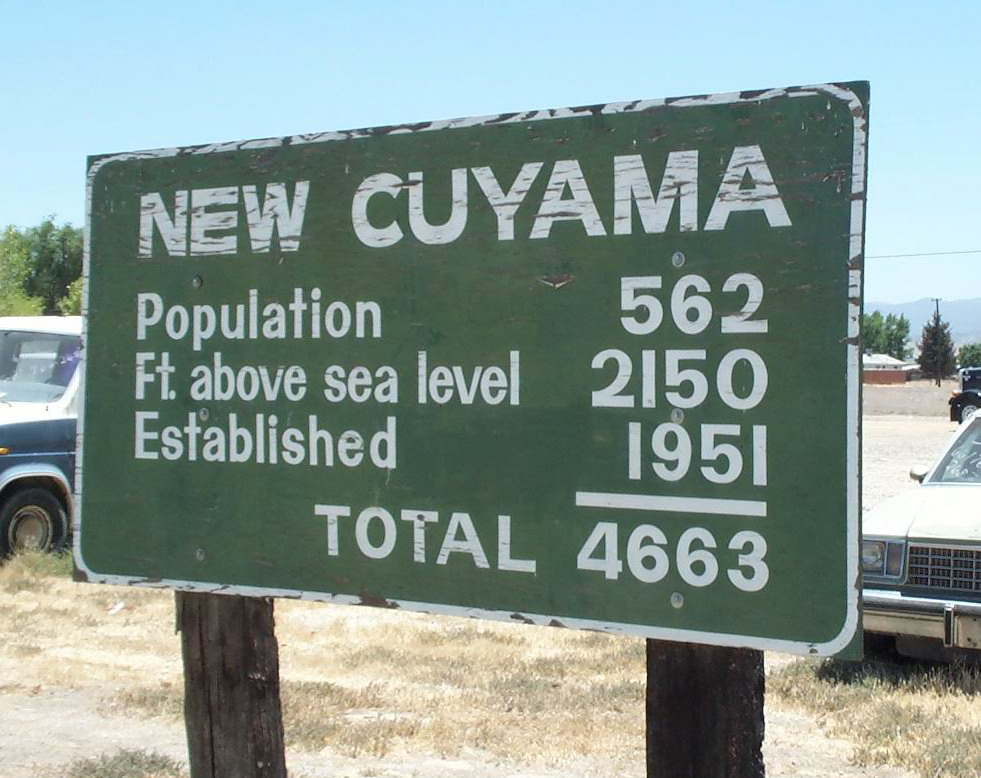
Humorously inappropriate use of numbers on a sign in New Cuyama, California

Humor of mathematicians may be classified into the esoteric and exoteric categories. Esoteric jokes rely on the intrinsic knowledge of mathematics and its terminology. Exoteric jokes are intelligible to outsiders, and most of them compare mathematicians with representatives of other disciplines or with ordinary folk.

== Pun-based jokes ==
$\sqrt{-1} \;2^3 \; \Sigma \; \pi$
Rebus for "I ate some pie."

Some jokes use a mathematical term with a second non-technical meaning as the punchline of a joke.

Q. What's purple and commutes?
A. An abelian grape. (A pun on abelian group.)

Occasionally, multiple mathematical puns appear in the same jest:

When Noah sends his animals to go forth and multiply, a pair of snakes replies, "We can't multiply, we're adders" – so Noah builds them a log table.

This invokes four double meanings: adder (snake) vs. addition (algebraic operation); multiplication (biological reproduction) vs. multiplication (algebraic operation); log (a cut tree trunk) vs. log (logarithm); and table (set of facts) vs. table (piece of furniture).

Other jokes create a double meaning from a direct calculation involving facetious variable names, such as this retold from Gravity's Rainbow:

Person 1: What's the integral of 1/cabin with respect to cabin?
Person 2: A log cabin.
Person 1: No, a houseboat; you forgot to add the C!

The first part of this joke relies on the fact that the primitive (formed when finding the antiderivative) of the function 1/x, for positive values, is log(x). The second part is then based on the fact that the antiderivative is actually a class of functions, requiring the inclusion of a constant of integration, usually denoted as C—something which calculus students may forget. Thus, the indefinite integral of 1/cabin is "log(cabin) + C", or "A log cabin plus the sea", i.e., "A houseboat".

== Jokes with numeral bases ==
Some jokes depend on the ambiguity of numerical bases.

There are only 10 types of people in the world: those who understand binary, and those who don't.

This joke subverts the trope of phrases that begin with "there are two types of people in the world..." and relies on an ambiguous meaning of the expression 10, which in the binary numeral system is equal to the decimal number 2.

Another pun using different radices asks:

Q. Why do mathematicians confuse Halloween and Christmas?
A. Because 31 Oct = 25 Dec.

The play on words lies in the similarity of the abbreviation for October/Octal and December/Decimal, and the coincidence that both equal the same number ($31_8 = 25_{10}$).

== Imaginary numbers ==
Mathematical joke playing on the Pythagorean theorem and imaginary numbers

Some jokes are based on the imaginary number i, treating it as if it were a real number. A telephone intercept message of "you have dialed an imaginary number, please rotate your handset ninety degrees and try again" is a typical example. Another popular example is: "What did π say to i? Get real. What did i say to π? Be rational."

== Stereotypes of mathematicians ==
Some jokes are based on stereotypes of mathematicians, who are often perceived as thinking in complicated, abstract terms, which can cause them to lose touch with the "real world." These comparisons liken mathematicians to physicists, engineers, or the "soft" sciences, such as an Englishman, an Irishman and a Scotsman, illustrating that other scientists undertake practical endeavors. In contrast, the mathematician proposes a theoretically valid but physically nonsensical solution.

A physicist, a biologist, and a mathematician are sitting in a café on the street, watching people enter and leave a nearby house. First, they see two people entering the house. Time passes. After a while, they notice three people leaving the house. The physicist says, "The measurement wasn't accurate." The biologist says, "They must have reproduced." The mathematician says, "If one more person enters the house, then it will be empty."

Mathematicians are also shown as averse to making hasty generalizations from a small amount of data, even if some form of generalization seems plausible:

An astronomer, a physicist, and a mathematician are on a train in Scotland. The astronomer looks out of the window, sees a black sheep standing in a field, and remarks, "The sheep in Scotland are black!" "No, no, no!" says the physicist. "At least one sheep in Scotland is black!" The mathematician rolls his eyes at his companions' muddled thinking and says, "In Scotland, there is at least one sheep, at least one side of which appears to be black from here some of the time."

A classic joke involving stereotypes is the "Dictionary of Definitions of Terms Commonly Used in Math Lectures". Examples include "Trivial: If I have to show you how to do this, you're in the wrong class", "Similarly: At least one line of the proof of this case is the same as before," and "This proof is left as an exercise to the reader."

== Non-mathematician's math ==
This category of jokes comprises those that exploit common misunderstandings of mathematics, or the expectation that most people have only a basic mathematical education, if any.

A museum visitor was admiring a Tyrannosaurus fossil and asked a nearby museum employee how old it was. "That skeleton's sixty-five million and three years, two months, and eighteen days old," the employee replied. "How can you be so precise?" she asked. "Well, when I started working here, I asked a scientist the same question, and he said it was sixty-five million years old—and that was three years, two months, and eighteen days ago."

The joke is that the employee fails to understand the scientist's implication of the uncertainty in the age of the fossil and uses false precision.

== Mock mathematics ==
A form of mathematical humor arises from using mathematical tools (both abstract symbols and physical objects, such as calculators) in unconventional ways that transcend their intended scope. These constructions are generally devoid of any substantial mathematical content, besides some basic arithmetic.

=== Mock mathematical reasoning ===
A set of jokes applies mathematical reasoning to situations where it is not entirely valid. Many are based on a combination of well-known quotes and basic logical constructs such as syllogisms:

Premise I:	Knowledge is power.
Premise II:	Power corrupts.
Conclusion:	Therefore, knowledge corrupts.

Another set of jokes relates to the absence of mathematical reasoning, or misinterpretation of conventional notation:

$$\left( \lim_{x\to 8^+} \frac{1}{x-8} = \infty \right) \Rightarrow \left( \lim_{x\to 3^+} \frac{1}{x-3} = \omega \right)$$

That is, the limit as x goes to 8 from above is a sideways 8 or the infinity sign, in the same way that the limit as x goes to three from above is a sideways 3 or the Greek letter omega (conventionally used to notate the smallest infinite ordinal number).

An anomalous cancellation is a kind of arithmetic procedural error that gives a numerically correct answer:

- $\frac{64}{16} = \frac{\cancel 64}{\,\,1\cancel 6} = \frac{4}{1} = 4$
- $\sqrt[6]{64} = \sqrt[\cancel 6]{\cancel{6}4} = \sqrt{4} = 2$
- $\frac{\mathrm d}{\mathrm d x}\frac{1}{x} = \frac{\cancel\mathrm d}{\cancel\mathrm d x}\frac 1x = \frac{}{x}\frac 1x = -\frac 1{x^2}$

=== Mathematical fallacies ===
A fallacious approach to calculating π due to the staircase paradox.

Several mathematical fallacies are part of mathematical humorous folklore. For example:
$$\begin{align}
b        &= a \\
ab       &= a^2 \\
ab - b^2 &= a^2 - b^2 \\
b(a - b) &= (a + b)(a - b) \\
b        &= a + b \\
b        &= b + b \\
b        &= 2b \\
1        &= 2
\end{align}$$
This appears to prove that 1 = 2, but uses division by zero (Note: Dividing by $(a-b)$ is invalid as the first line assumed $b=a \implies a-b=0$.) to produce the result.

Some jokes attempt a seemingly plausible, but in fact impossible, mathematical operation. For example:

Pi goes on and on and on ...
And e is just as cursed.
I wonder: Which is larger
When their digits are reversed?

To reverse the digits of a number's decimal expansion, we have to start at the last digit and work backwards. However, that is not possible if the expansion never ends, which is true in the case of $\pi$ and $e$.

=== Humorous numbers ===
Many numbers have been given humorous names, either as pure numbers or as units of measurement. Some examples:

Sagan has been defined as "billions and billions", a metric of the number of stars in the observable universe.

Jenny's constant has been defined as $J = (7^{e - 1/e} - 9) \cdot \pi^2 = 867.5309\ldots.$ (sequence A182369 in the OEIS), from the pop song "867-5309/Jenny", which concerns the telephone number 867-5309.

The number 42 appears prominently in the Douglas Adams trilogy The Hitchhiker's Guide to the Galaxy, where it is portrayed as "the answer to the ultimate question of life, the universe, and everything". This number appears as a fixed value in the TIFF image file format and its derivatives (including, for example, the ISO standard TIFF/EP), where the content of bytes 2–3 is defined as 42: "An arbitrary but carefully chosen number that further identifies the file as a TIFF file".

The number 69 is commonly used in reference to a group of sex positions in which two people align to perform oral sex, thus becoming mutually inverted like the numerals 6 and 9. Because of this association, "69" has become an internet meme and is known as "the sex number" in some communities.

The number 420 is cannabis culture slang for cannabis consumption, especially smoking around the time 4:20 p.m., and also refers to cannabis-oriented celebrations that take place annually on April 20, which is "4/20" in U.S. date form.

In the context of numerical humor, one classic example is the joke, "Why was six afraid of seven? Because seven eight (ate) nine!" The humor in this statement originates from a linguistic play on numbers and fundamental arithmetic.

=== Calculator spelling ===
Calculator spelling is the formation of words and phrases by displaying a number and turning the calculator upside down. The jest may be formulated as a mathematical problem where the result, when read upside down, appears to be an identifiable phrase like "ShELL OIL" or "Esso" using seven-segment display character representations where the open-top "4" is an inverted 'h' and '5' looks like 'S'. Other letters can also be used as numbers, with 8 and 9 representing B and G, respectively.

An attributed example of calculator spelling, which dates back to the 1970s, is 5318008, which, when turned over, spells "BOOBIES".

=== Limericks ===
A mathematical limerick is an expression that, when read aloud, matches the form of a limerick. The following numerically correct example is attributed to Leigh Mercer:
$$\frac{12 + 144 + 20 + 3 \sqrt{4}}{7} + (5 \times 11) = 9^2+0$$
This is read as follows:

A dozen, a gross, and a score
Plus three times the square root of four
Divided by seven
Plus five times eleven
Is nine squared and not a bit more.

Another example using calculus is (Note: The variable's name 'z' should be pronounced as zee to make a proper rhyme with 'three' and 'e'.):
$$\int_{1}^{\sqrt[3]{3}}z^2 dz \cdot \cos\left(\frac{3\pi}{9}\right) = \log(\sqrt[3]{e})$$
which may be read:

Integral z-squared dz
From one to the cube root of three
Times the cosine
of three pi over nine
Equals log of the cube root of e

The limerick is true if $\log$ is interpreted as the natural logarithm.

== Doughnut and coffee mug topology joke ==
A continuous deformation (homeomorphism) of a coffee mug into a doughnut (torus) and back

An oft-repeated joke is that topologists cannot tell a coffee cup from a doughnut, since they are topologically equivalent: a sufficiently pliable doughnut could be reshaped (by a homeomorphism) to the form of a cup by creating a dimple and progressively enlarging it, while shrinking the hole into a handle.

== Category theory ==
Category theory is a common source of esoteric mathematical jokes, due to its high level of abstraction. Recall that a category is a kind of mathematical structure consisting of points and arrows between these points. For any concept in category theory, the dual concept reverses the directions of all arrows. The name of the dual concept is simply the name of the original idea with the prefix "co" added in front. Thus,

A coconut is just a nut.

The joke is that when the dual is taken twice, the direction of the arrows remains the same, and hence the double "co" is redundant.

Another joke references a quote by Alfréd Rényi: "A mathematician is a device for turning coffee into theorems." If the dual is taken, the quote becomes

A comathematician is a device for turning cotheorems into ffee.

Not only are "coffee" and "theorems" dualized, their order is also swapped, since taking the dual reverses the direction of arrows.

== See also ==
- All horses are the same color
- New Math (song)
- Spherical cow
- When a white horse is not a horse
