= Mathematical coincidence =

Coincidence in mathematics

A mathematical coincidence is said to occur when two expressions with no direct relationship show a near-equality which has no apparent theoretical explanation.

For example, there is a near-equality close to the round number 1000 between powers of 2 and powers of 10:

$$2^{10} = 1024 \approx 1000 = 10^3.$$

Some mathematical coincidences are used in engineering when one expression is taken as an approximation of another.

== Introduction ==
A mathematical coincidence often involves an integer, and the surprising feature is the fact that a real number arising in some context is considered by some standard as a "close" approximation to a small integer or to a multiple or power of ten, or more generally, to a rational number with a small denominator. Other kinds of mathematical coincidences, such as integers simultaneously satisfying multiple seemingly unrelated criteria or coincidences regarding units of measurement, may also be considered. In the class of those coincidences that are of a purely mathematical sort, some simply result from sometimes very deep mathematical facts, while others appear to come 'out of the blue'.

Given the countably infinite number of ways of forming mathematical expressions using a finite number of symbols, the number of symbols used and the precision of approximate equality might be the most obvious way to assess mathematical coincidences; but there is no standard, and the strong law of small numbers is the sort of thing one has to appeal to with no formal opposing mathematical guidance. Beyond this, some sense of mathematical aesthetics could be invoked to adjudicate the value of a mathematical coincidence, and there are in fact exceptional cases of true mathematical significance (see Ramanujan's constant below, which made it into print some years ago as a scientific April Fools' joke). All in all, though, they are generally to be considered for their curiosity value, or perhaps to encourage new mathematical learners at an elementary level.

== Some examples ==
=== Rational approximants ===
Sometimes simple rational approximations are exceptionally close to interesting irrational values. These are explainable in terms of large terms in the continued fraction representation of the irrational value, but further insight into why such improbably large terms occur is often not available.

Rational approximants (convergents of continued fractions) to ratios of logs of different numbers are often invoked as well, making coincidences between the powers of those numbers.

Many other coincidences are combinations of numbers that put them into the form that such rational approximants provide close relationships.

==== Concerning π ====
- The second convergent of π, [3; 7] = 22/7 = 3.1428..., was known to Archimedes, and is correct to about 0.04%. The fourth convergent of π, [3; 7, 15, 1] = 355/113 = 3.1415929..., found by Zu Chongzhi, is correct to six decimal places; this high accuracy comes about because π has an unusually large next term in its continued fraction representation: π = [3; 7, 15, 1, 292, ...].
- A coincidence involving π and the golden ratio φ is given by $\pi \approx 4 / \sqrt{\varphi} = 3.1446\dots$. Consequently, the square on the middle-sized edge of a Kepler triangle is similar in perimeter to its circumcircle. Some believe one or the other of these coincidences is to be found in the Great Pyramid of Giza, but it is highly improbable that this was intentional.
- There is a sequence of six nines in pi beginning at the 762nd decimal place of its decimal representation. For a randomly chosen normal number, the probability of a particular sequence of six consecutive digits—of any type, not just a repeating one—to appear this early is 0.08%. Pi is conjectured, but not known, to be a normal number.
- The first Feigenbaum constant is approximately equal to $\tfrac{10}{\pi-1}$, with an error of 0.0047%.

==== Concerning base 2 ====
- The coincidence $2^{10} = 1024 \approx 1000 = 10^3$, correct to 2.4%, relates to the rational approximation $\textstyle\log_2(10) \approx 3.3219 \approx \frac{10}{3}$, or $2 \approx 10^{3/10}$ to within 0.3%. This relationship is used in engineering, for example to approximate a factor of two in power as 3 dB (actual is 3.0103 dB – see Half-power point), or to relate a kibibyte to a kilobyte; see binary prefix. The same numerical coincidence is responsible for the near equality between one third of an octave and one tenth of a decade.
- The same coincidence can also be expressed as $128 = 2^7 \approx 5^3 = 125$ (eliminating common factor of $2^3$, so also correct to 2.4%), which corresponds to the rational approximation $\textstyle\log_2(5) \approx 2.3219 \approx \frac{7}{3}$, or $2 \approx 5^{3/7}$ (also to within 0.4%). This is invoked in preferred numbers in engineering, such as shutter speed settings on cameras, as approximations to powers of two (128, 256, 512) in the sequence of speeds 125, 250, 500, etc., and in the original Who Wants to Be a Millionaire? game show in the question values ...£16,000, £32,000, £64,000, £125,000, £250,000,...

==== Concerning musical intervals ====
In music, the distances between notes (intervals) are measured as ratios of their frequencies, with near-rational ratios often sounding harmonious. In western twelve-tone equal temperament, the ratio between consecutive note frequencies is $\sqrt[12]{2}$.

- The coincidence $2^{19} \approx 3^{12}$, from $\log_2(3) = 1.5849\ldots \approx \frac{19}{12}$, closely relates the interval of 7 semitones in equal temperament to a perfect fifth of just intonation: $2^{7/12}\approx 3/2$, correct to about 0.1%. The just fifth is the basis of Pythagorean tuning; the difference between twelve just fifths and seven octaves is the Pythagorean comma.
- The coincidence ${(3/2)}^{4} = (81/16) \approx 5$ permitted the development of meantone temperament, in which just perfect fifths (ratio $3/2$) and major thirds ($5/4$) are "tempered" so that four $3/2$'s is approximately equal to $5/1$, or a $5/4$ major third up two octaves. The difference ($81/80$) between these stacks of intervals is the syntonic comma.
- The coincidence $\sqrt[12]{2}\sqrt[7]{5} = 1.33333319\ldots \approx \frac43$ leads to the rational version of 12-TET, as noted by Johann Kirnberger.
- The coincidence $\sqrt[8]{5}\sqrt[3]{35} = 4.00000559\ldots \approx 4$ leads to the rational version of quarter-comma meantone temperament.
- The coincidence of powers of 2, above, leads to the approximation that three major thirds concatenate to an octave, ${(5/4)}^{3} \approx {2/1}$. This and similar approximations in music are called dieses.

=== Numerical expressions ===
==== Concerning powers of π ====
- $\pi^2\approx10;$ correct to about 1.32%. This can be understood in terms of the formula for the zeta function $\zeta(2)=\pi^2/6.$ This coincidence was used in the design of slide rules, where the "folded" scales are folded on $\pi$ rather than $\sqrt{10},$ because it is a more useful number and has the effect of folding the scales in about the same place.
- $\pi^2+\pi\approx13;$ correct to about 0.086%.
- $\pi^2\approx 227/23,$ correct to 4 parts per million.
- $\pi^3\approx31,$ correct to 0.02%.
- $2\pi^3 -\pi^2-\pi \approx7^2,$ correct to about 0.002% and can be seen as a combination of the above coincidences.
- $\pi^4\approx 2143/22;$ or $\pi\approx\left(9^2+\frac{19^2}{22}\right)^{1/4},$ accurate to 9 decimal places (due to Ramanujan: Quarterly Journal of Mathematics, XLV, 1914, pp. 350–372). Ramanujan states that this "curious approximation" to $\pi$ was "obtained empirically" and has no connection with the theory developed in the remainder of the paper.
- Some near-equivalences, which hold to a high degree of accuracy, are not actually coincidences. For example,
  $$\int_0^\infty \cos(2x)\prod_{n=1}^\infty \cos\left(\frac{x}{n}\right)\mathrm{d}x \approx \frac{\pi}{8}.$$

The two sides of this expression differ only after the 42nd decimal place; this is not a coincidence.

==== Containing both π and e ====
- $\pi \approx 1 + e - \gamma$ to 4 digits, where γ is the Euler–Mascheroni constant.
- $\pi^4+\pi^5\approx e^6$, to about 7 decimal places. Equivalently, $4 \cdot \ln(\pi) + \ln(\pi+1) \approx 6$.
- $(e-1)\pi\approx\sqrt{5}+\sqrt{10}$, to about 4 decimal places.
- $\left(\frac{\pi}{2} - \ln\left( \frac{3\pi}{2}\right) \right)42\pi \approx e$, to about 9 decimal places.
- $e^\pi - \pi\approx 20$ to about 4 decimal places (Conway, Sloane, Plouffe, 1988); this is equivalent to $(\pi+20)^i=-0.999 999 999 2\ldots -i\cdot 0.000 039\ldots \approx -1.$ Once considered a textbook example of a mathematical coincidence, the fact that $e^\pi - \pi$ is close to 20 is itself not a coincidence, although the approximation is an order of magnitude closer than would be expected. It is a consequence of the infinite sum $\textstyle\sum_{k=1}^{\infty }\left ( 8\pi k^{2}-2 \right )e^{\left (-\pi k^{2} \right )}=1,$ resulting from the Jacobian theta functional identity. The first term of the sum is by far the largest, which gives the approximation $\left (8\pi-2 \right )e^{-\pi}\approx 1,$ or $e^{\pi}\approx 8\pi-2.$ Using the estimate $\pi \approx 22/7$ then gives $e^{\pi}\approx \pi+(7\cdot\frac{22}{7}-2) = \pi+20.$ Although not widely known, an explanation for it has been circulating since the early 2000s, and possibly earlier.
- $\pi^e+e^\pi \approx 45\frac{3}{5}$, within 4 parts per million.
- $\pi^9/e^8\approx 10$, to about 5 decimal places. That is, $\ln(\pi) \approx {\ln(10)+8 \over 9}$, within 0.0002%.
- $2\pi + e \approx 9$, within 0.02%.
- $e^{-\frac{\pi}{9}} + e^{-4\frac{\pi}{9}} + e^{-9\frac{\pi}{9}} + e^{-16\frac{\pi}{9}} + e^{-25\frac{\pi}{9}} + e^{-36\frac{\pi}{9}} + e^{-49\frac{\pi}{9}} + e^{-64\frac{\pi}{9}} = 1.00000000000105\ldots \approx 1$. In fact, this generalizes to the approximate identity $\textstyle\sum_{k=1}^{n-1}{e^{-\frac{k^2\pi}{n}}}\approx\frac{-1+\sqrt{n}}{2},$ which can be explained by the Jacobian theta functional identity.
- Ramanujan's constant: $e^{\pi\sqrt{163}} \approx 262537412640768744 = 12^3(231^2-1)^3+744$, within $2.9\cdot 10^{-28}\%$, discovered in 1859 by Charles Hermite. This very close approximation is not a typical sort of accidental mathematical coincidence, where no mathematical explanation is known or expected to exist (as is the case for most). It is a consequence of the fact that 163 is a Heegner number.
- There are several integers $k= 2198, 422151, 614552, 2508952, 6635624, 199148648,\dots$ ((sequence A019297 in the OEIS)) such that $\pi \approx \frac{\ln(k)}{\sqrt{n}}$ for some integer n, or equivalently $k \approx e^{\pi\sqrt{n}}$ for the same $n = 6, 17, 18, 22, 25, 37,\dots$ These are not strictly coincidental because they are related to both Ramanujan's constant above and the Heegner numbers. For example, $k=199148648 = 14112^2+104,$ so these integers k are near-squares or near-cubes and note the consistent forms for n = 18, 22, 37,

$$\pi \approx \frac{\ln (784^2-104)}{\sqrt{18}}$$
$$\pi \approx \frac{\ln (1584^2-104)}{\sqrt{22}}$$
$$\pi \approx \frac{\ln (14112^2+104)}{\sqrt{37}}$$

with the last accurate to 13 decimal places.

- $(e^e)^e \approx 1000\varphi$
- $\frac{10(e^\pi-\ln3)}{\ln2} = 318.000000033\ldots$ is almost an integer, to the 7th decimal place.

=== Other numerical curiosities ===
- In a discussion of the birthday problem, the number $\lambda=\frac{1}{365}{23\choose 2}=\frac{253}{365}$ occurs, which is "amusingly" equal to $\ln(2)$ to 4 digits.
- $5 \cdot 10^5 - 1 = 31 \cdot 127 \cdot 127$, the product of three Mersenne primes.
- $\sqrt[6]{6!}$, the geometric mean of the first 6 natural numbers, is approximately 2.99; that is, $6! = 720 \approx 729 = 3^6$.
- The sixth harmonic number,
  $$H_6= 1+\frac{1}{2}+\frac{1}{3}+\frac{1}{4}+\frac{1}{5}+\frac{1}{6} = \frac{49}{20} = 2.45$$
  which is approximately $\sqrt{6}$ (2.449489...) to within 5.2 × 10^{−4}.
- $\sqrt[5]{109} \approx \frac{23}{9}$, within $2 \times 10^{-7}$.

=== Decimal coincidences ===
- $3^3+4^4+3^3+5^5=3435$, making 3435 the only non-trivial Münchhausen number in base 10 (excluding 0 and 1). If one adopts the convention that $0^0=0$, however, then 438579088 is another Münchhausen number.
- $\,1!+4!+5!=145$ and $\,4!+0!+5!+8!+5!=40585$ are the only non-trivial factorions in base 10 (excluding 1 and 2).
- $\frac{16}{64}=\frac{1\!\!\!\not6}{\not64}=\frac{1}{4}$, $\frac{26}{65}=\frac{2\!\!\!\not6}{\not65}=\frac {2}{5}$, $\frac{19}{95}=\frac{1\!\!\!\not9}{\not95}=\frac{1}{5}$, and $\frac{49}{98}=\frac{4\!\!\!\not9}{\not98}=\frac{4}{8}$. If the end result of these four anomalous cancellations are multiplied, their product reduces to exactly 1/100.
- $\,(4+9+1+3)^3=4913$, $\,(5+8+3+2)^3=5832$, and $\,(1+9+6+8+3)^3=19683$. (In a similar vein, $\,(3+4)^3=343$.)
- $\,-1+2^7=127$, making 127 the smallest nice Friedman number. A similar example is $2^5\cdot9^2=2592$.
- $\,1^3+5^3+3^3=153$, $\,3^3+7^3+0^3=370$, $\,3^3+7^3+1^3=371$, and $\,4^3+0^3+7^3=407$ are all narcissistic numbers.
- $\,588^2+2353^2=5882353$, a prime number. The fraction 1/17 also produces 0.05882353 when rounded to 8 digits.
- $\,2^1+6^2+4^3+6^4+7^5+9^6+8^7=2646798$. The largest number with this pattern is $\,12157692622039623539=1^1+2^2+1^3+\ldots+9^{20}$.
- $13532385396179=13\times53^{2}\times3853\times96179$. This number, found in 2017, answers a question by John Conway whether the digits of a composite number could be the same as its prime factorization. A similar example (in fact the smallest) in binary is $255987=3^{3}\times19\times499$, whose prime factorization in binary reads $111110011111110011=11^{11}\times10011\times111110011$. Examples in other bases include $3518=3^{5}\times18$ in base 11 (in decimal: $4617=3^{5}\times19$), and $15287=15^{2}\times87$ in base 12 (in decimal: $29767=17^2\times103$).

Also, there exist pairs of numbers such that each is the concatenation of the primes and exponents in the prime factorization of the other in binary:
$1111101111 = 10011\times110101$ ($1007=19\times53$), $10011110101 = 11^{11}\times101111$ ($1269=3^{3}\times47$);
$10111011111 = 11^{10}\times10100111$ ($1503=3^{2}\times167$), $111010100111 = 1011^{10}\times11111$ ($3751=11^{2}\times31$).

=== Numerical coincidences in numbers from the physical world ===
==== Speed of light ====
The speed of light is (by definition) exactly 299792458 m/s, extremely close to 3.0×10^{8} m/s (300000000 m/s). This is a pure coincidence, as the metre was originally defined as 1 / 10000000 of the distance between the Earth's pole and equator along the surface at sea level, and the Earth's circumference just happens to be about 2/15 of a light-second. It is also roughly equal to one foot per nanosecond (the actual number is 0.9836 ft/ns).

==== Angular diameters of the Sun and the Moon ====
As seen from Earth, the angular diameter of the Sun varies between 31′27″ and 32′32″, while that of the Moon is between 29′20″ and 34′6″. The fact that the intervals overlap (the former interval is contained in the latter) is a coincidence, and has implications for the types of solar eclipses that can be observed from Earth.

==== Gravitational acceleration ====
While not constant but varying depending on latitude and altitude, the numerical value of the acceleration caused by Earth's gravity on the surface lies between 9.74 and 9.87 m/s^{2}, which is quite close to 10. This means that as a result of Newton's second law, the weight of a kilogram of mass on Earth's surface corresponds roughly to 10 newtons of force exerted on an object.

This is related to the aforementioned coincidence that the square of pi is close to 10. One of the early definitions of the metre was the length of a pendulum whose half swing had a period equal to one second. Since the period of the full swing of a pendulum is approximated by the equation below, algebra shows that if this definition was maintained, gravitational acceleration measured in metres per second per second would be exactly equal to π^{2}.

$$T \approx 2\pi \sqrt\frac{L}{g}$$

The upper limit of gravity on Earth's surface (9.87 m/s^{2}) is equal to π^{2} m/s^{2} to four significant figures. It is approximately 0.6% greater than standard gravity (9.80665 m/s^{2}).

==== Rydberg constant ====
The Rydberg constant, when multiplied by the speed of light and expressed as a frequency, is close to $\frac{\pi^2}{3}\times 10^{15}\ \text{Hz}$:

$\underline{3.2898}41960364(17) \times 10^{15}\ \text{Hz} = R_\infty c$
$$\underline{3.2898}68133696\ldots = \frac{\pi^2}{3}$$

This is also approximately the number of feet in one meter:

$3.28084$ ft $\approx 1$ m

==== US customary to metric conversions ====
One mile is the same length as 1.609344 kilometres.

As discovered by Randall Munroe, a cubic mile is close to $\frac{4}{3}\pi$ cubic kilometres (within 0.5%). This means that a sphere with radius n kilometres has almost exactly the same volume as a cube with side length n miles. Exact equality would make the conversion factor equal to $(\tfrac43\pi)^\frac13\approx1.612\,.$

The ratio of a mile to a kilometre is also approximately the golden ratio $\varphi = \frac{1+\sqrt{5}}{2}\approx1.618\,.$ As a consequence, a Fibonacci number of miles is approximately the next Fibonacci number of kilometres.

The ratio of a mile to a kilometre is also very close to $\ln(5)\approx1.6094379,$ within 0.006%. This means that $5^m \approx e^k,$ where $m$ is the number of miles, $k$ is the number of kilometres and $e$ is Euler's number.

A density of one ounce per cubic foot is very close to one kilogram per cubic metre: 1 oz / ft^{3} = 0.028349523125 kg / (0.3048 m)^{3} ≈ 1.0012 kg/m^{3}.

The conversion factor between troy ounces and grams (1 troy ounce = 31.1034768 g) is approximately equal to $10\pi-\frac{\pi}{10} = \frac{99}{10}\pi\approx31.1018\,.$

==== Size of the Earth ====
Earth's polar diameter (12,713.5 km) is close to 500,000,000 in (12,700 km), within 0.1%. Because the metre was originally defined as exactly 1/10,000,000th the distance from the equator to the North Pole, this is equivalent to 8 cm (3.1496 in) being close to $\pi$ inches.

This approximation also provides a convenient conversion between imperial and metric measurements: a circle exactly one inch in diameter has a circumference of approximately 8 cm (2.54π ≈ 7.98 cm), an error of about 0.26%.

==== Fine-structure constant ====
The fine-structure constant $\alpha$ is close to, and was once conjectured to be precisely equal to 1/137. Its CODATA recommended value is

$\alpha$ = 1/137.035999177(21)

$\alpha$ is a dimensionless physical constant, so this coincidence is not an artifact of the system of units being used.

==== Earth's solar orbit ====
The number of seconds in one year, based on the Gregorian calendar, can be calculated by: $365.2425\left(\frac{\text{days}}{\text{year}}\right)\times 24\left(\frac{\text{hours}}{\text{day}}\right)\times 60\left(\frac{\text{minutes}}{\text{hour}}\right) \times 60\left(\frac{\text{seconds}}{\text{minute}}\right)= 31,556,952\left(\frac{\text{seconds}}{\text{year}}\right)$

This value can be approximated by $\pi\times10^7$ or 31,415,926.54 with less than one percent of an error: $\left[1 - \left(\frac{31,415,926.54}{31,556,952}\right)\right]\times 100 = 0.4489%$

==== Proton-to-electron mass ratio ====
$6\pi^{5} \approx 1836.12$ is very close to the proton-to-electron mass ratio $\mu=m_{p}/m_{e} \approx 1836.153$ (a dimensionless constant), within 0.002%. When this was first pointed out in 1951, the best known value for $\mu$ was 1836.12, which differs from $6\pi^{5}$ by just 0.0001%.

== See also ==
- Almost integer
- Anthropic principle
- Birthday problem
- Exceptional isomorphism
- Experimental mathematics
- Koide formula
- Narcissistic number
- Sophomore's dream
- Strong law of small numbers
