= Least common divisor =

The phrase least common divisor is a confusion of the following two distinct concepts in arithmetic:

- Least common multiple
- Greatest common divisor
