= Greatest common multiple =

The greatest common multiple is a term mistakenly used to refer to:

- Least common denominator, the lowest common multiple of the denominators of a set of fractions
- Greatest common divisor, the largest positive integer that divides each of the integers

== See also ==
- Lowest common divisor
