= Lowest common divisor =

The lowest common divisor is a term mistakenly used to refer to:

- Lowest common denominator, the lowest common multiple of the denominators of a set of fractions
- Greatest common divisor, the largest positive integer that divides each of the integers

== See also ==
- Greatest common multiple
