= Formula for primes =

Formula whose values are the prime numbers

In number theory, a formula for primes is a formula that outputs prime numbers. Such formulas for calculating primes do exist; however, they are computationally very slow, compared to a simple algorithm for prime-finding. A number of constraints are known, showing what such a "formula" can and cannot be.

== Formulas based on Wilson's theorem ==
A simple formula that produces all primes, albeit mostly interspersed by the prime number 2, is

$$f(n) = \left\lfloor \frac{n! \bmod (n+1)}{n} \right\rfloor (n-1) + 2$$

for positive integer $n$, where $\lfloor\ \rfloor$ is the floor function, which rounds down to the nearest integer. The first few values of the function are 2, 2, 3, 2, 5, 2, 7, 2, 2, 2, 11...

The formula works because by Wilson's theorem, $n+1$ is prime if and only if $n! \equiv n \!\!\!\!\!\pmod{n+1}$. Thus, when $n+1$ is prime, the first factor in the product becomes one, and the formula produces the prime number $n+1$. But when $n+1$ is not prime, the first factor becomes zero and the formula produces the prime number 2. This formula is not an efficient way to generate prime numbers because evaluating $n! \bmod (n+1)$ requires about $n-1$ multiplications and reductions modulo $n+1$.

In 1964, Willans gave the formula

$$p_n = 1 + \sum_{i=1}^{2^n} \left\lfloor \left(\frac{n}{\sum_{j=1}^i \left\lfloor\left(\cos \frac{(j-1)! + 1}{j} \pi\right)^2\right\rfloor }\right)^{1/n} \right\rfloor$$

for the $n$th prime number $p_n$. This formula reduces to

$$p_n = 1 + \sum_{i=1}^{2^n}[\pi(i) < n];$$

that is, it tautologically defines $p_n$ as the smallest integer $m$ for which the prime-counting function $\pi(m)$ is at least $n$. This formula is also not efficient. In addition to the appearance of $(j-1)!$, it computes $p_n$ by adding up $p_n$ copies of $1$; for example,

$$p_5 = 1 + 1 + 1 + 1 + 1 + 1 + 1 + 1 + 1 + 1 + 1 + 0 + 0 + \dots + 0 = 11.$$

The articles What is an Answer? by Herbert Wilf (1982) and Formulas for Primes by Underwood Dudley (1983) have further discussion about the worthlessness of such formulas.

A shorter formula based on Wilson's theorem was given by J. P. Jones in 1975, using $\mathrm{mod}$ as a function:

$$p_n = \sum_{i=0}^{n^{2}}\left(1 \mathop {\dot -} \left(\left(\sum_{j=0}^i (j \mathop {\dot -} 1)!^2 \bmod j \right) \mathop {\dot -} n \right)\right)$$.

Here, $\mathop {\dot -}$ is the monus operator, defined as $a \mathbin{\dot{-}} b = \max(a - b, 0)$, and $x \bmod 0$ is defined to be $x$.

== Recurrence relations for primes ==
=== Gandhi's formula ===
In 1971, J. M. Gandhi proved that
$$p_n =\left\lfloor 1 - \log_{2}\left(s_{n-1}-\frac{1}{2}\right)\right\rfloor,$$
where $s_n = \sum_{d|p_n\#}\frac{\mu(d)}{2^d-1}$, $\mu$ is the Möbius function and $d$ runs through all divisors of $p_n\#$, the primorial of $p_n$. This formula should be seen as a recurrence relation for the prime numbers, expressing $p_n$ in terms of $p_1, p_2, \dots, p_{n-1}$.

This expression for $s_n$ given by Gandhi results from an application of a modified Sieve of Eratosthenes operating on the exponents of the powers of $\frac12$ in the sum $\sum_{k=1}^{\infty}\frac{1}{2^k}$ after $n$ steps. More precisely, Gandhi showed that $s_n = \frac1{2^1} + \frac1{2^{p_{n+1}}} + \dots$, where the dots represent terms with increasing exponents greater than $p_{n+1}$. There are analog recurrences where the process is done in a base $b$ other than $2$.

In 2025, a simpler expression for $s_n$ was published:

$s_n=\left\{\frac{1}{2^{p_n\#} -1}\prod _{i=1}^n \frac{2^{p_n\#}-2^{p_n\# /p_{i}}}{2^{p_n\#/p_{i}} -1}\right\}$, where $\{x\}$ denotes the fractional part of $x$.

It is based on a more clever use of the Sieve of Eratosthenes through the Chinese remainder theorem.

=== Golomb's formula ===
Inspired by Gandhi's proof, Golomb proved the following recurrence
$$p_n =\lim_{s\to\infty} \left(\zeta(s) \prod_{k=1}^{n-1} (1-p_k^{-s}) - 1\right)^{-\frac{1}{s}},$$
where $\zeta$ denotes the Riemann zeta function. It is based on the Euler product for $\zeta$.

== Prime-representing constants ==
The notion of continued fraction can be used to define the constant $u_1=[p_1,p_2,p_3,...]=2.31303673643...$ (sequence A064442 in the OEIS) from which we can recover the prime number sequence using the following recurrence relationship $u_{n+1} = (u_n - \lfloor u_n\rfloor)^{-1}$, and it follows that $p_n = \lfloor u_n \rfloor$.

An alternative construction was given by Fridman et al.. Given the constant $f_1 = 2.920050977316\ldots$ (sequence A249270 in the OEIS), for $n \ge 2$, define the sequence
$$f_n = \lfloor f_{n-1} \rfloor(f_{n-1} - \lfloor f_{n-1} \rfloor + 1 )$$
where $\left\lfloor\ \right\rfloor$ is the floor function. Then for $n \ge 1$, $p_n = \lfloor f_n \rfloor$. The initial constant $f_1 = 2.920050977316$ given in the article is precise enough for equation (1) to generate the primes through 37, the twelfth prime.

The exact value of $f_1$ that generates all primes is given by the rapidly-converging series

$$f_1 = \sum_{n=1}^\infty \frac{p_n - 1}{p_{n-1}\#}
= \frac{2 - 1}{1} + \frac{3 - 1}{2} + \frac{5 - 1}{2 \cdot 3} + \frac{7 - 1}{2 \cdot 3 \cdot 5} + \cdots,$$

The more digits of $f_1$ that we know, the more primes equation (1) will generate. For example, we can use 25 terms in the series, using the 25 primes less than 100, to calculate the following more precise approximation:

$$f_1 \simeq 2.920050977316134712092562917112019.$$

This has enough digits for equation (1) to yield again the 25 primes less than 100.

== Mills' formula ==
The first such formula known was established by W. H. Mills (1947), who proved that there exists a real number A such that, if

$$d_n = A^{3^{n}}$$

then

$$\left \lfloor d_n \right \rfloor = \left \lfloor A^{3^{n}} \right \rfloor$$

is a prime number for all positive integers $n$. If the Riemann hypothesis is true, then the smallest such $A$ has a value of around 1.3063778838630806904686144926... (sequence A051021 in the OEIS) and is known as Mills' constant. This value gives rise to the primes $\lfloor d_1 \rfloor = 2$, $\lfloor d_2 \rfloor = 11$, $\lfloor d_3 \rfloor = 1361$, ... (sequence A051254 in the OEIS). Very little is known about the constant $A$. This formula has no practical value, because there is no known way of calculating the constant without finding primes in the first place.

There is nothing special about the floor function in the formula. Tóth proved that there also exists a constant $B$ such that

$$\left\lceil B^{r^{n}} \right\rceil$$

is also prime-representing for $r>2.106\ldots$.

In the case $r=3$, the value of the constant $B$ begins with 1.24055470525201424067... The first few primes generated are:

$$2, 7, 337, 38272739, 56062005704198360319209,$$
$$176199995814327287356671209104585864397055039072110696028654438846269, \ldots$$

Without assuming the Riemann hypothesis, Elsholtz developed several prime-representing functions similar to those of Mills. For example, if $A = 1.00536773279814724017 \ldots$, then $\left\lfloor A^{10^{10n}} \right\rfloor$ is prime for all positive integers $n$. Similarly, if $A = 3.8249998073439146171615551375 \ldots$, then $\left\lfloor A^{3^{13n}} \right\rfloor$ is prime for all positive integers $n$.

== Wright's formula ==
A tetrationally growing prime-generating formula similar to Mills' comes from a theorem of E. M. Wright. He proved that there exists a real number α such that, if

$g_0 = \alpha$ and
$g_{n+1} = 2^{g_n}$ for $n \ge 0$,

then

$$\lfloor g_n \rfloor = \left\lfloor 2^{\dots^{2^{2^\alpha}}} \right\rfloor$$

is prime for all $n \ge 1$. Wright gives the first seven decimal places of such a constant: $\alpha = 1.9287800$. This value gives rise to the primes $\lfloor g_1 \rfloor = \lfloor 2^{\alpha} \rfloor = 3$, $\lfloor g_2 \rfloor = 13$, and $\lfloor g_3 \rfloor = 16381$. $\lfloor g_4 \rfloor$ is even, and so is not prime. However, with $\alpha = 1.9287800 + 8.2843 \cdot 10^{-4933}$, $\lfloor g_1 \rfloor$, $\lfloor g_2 \rfloor$, and $\lfloor g_3 \rfloor$ are unchanged, while $\lfloor g_4 \rfloor$ is a prime with 4932 digits. This sequence of primes cannot be extended beyond $\lfloor g_4 \rfloor$ without knowing more digits of $\alpha$. Like Mills' formula, and for the same reasons, Wright's formula cannot be used to find primes.

== Plouffe's formulas ==
In 2018 Simon Plouffe conjectured a set of formulas for primes. Similarly to the formula of Mills, they are of the form

$$\left\{a_0^{r^n}\right\}$$

where $\{\ \}$ is the function rounding to the nearest integer. For example, with $a_0\approx 43.80468771580293481$ and $r=5/4$, this gives 113, 367, 1607, 10177, 102217... (sequence A323176 in the OEIS). Using $a_0=10^{500}+961+\varepsilon$ and $r=1.01$ with $\varepsilon$ a certain number between 0 and one half, Plouffe found that he could generate a sequence of 50 probable primes (with high probability of being prime). Presumably there exists an ε such that this formula will give an infinite sequence of actual prime numbers. The number of digits starts at 501 and increases by about 1% each time. (Note: Plouffe (2019) As of January 2019, the number he gives in the appendix for the 50th number generated is actually the 48th.)

== Prime formulas and polynomial functions ==
It is known that no non-constant polynomial function P(n) with integer coefficients exists that evaluates to a prime number for all integers n. The proof is as follows: suppose that such a polynomial existed. Then P(1) would evaluate to a prime p, so $P(1) \equiv 0 \pmod p$. But for any integer k, $P(1+kp) \equiv 0 \pmod p$ also, so $P(1+kp)$ cannot also be prime (as it would be divisible by p) unless it were p itself. But the only way $P(1+kp) = P(1) = p$ for all k is if the polynomial function is constant. The same reasoning shows an even stronger result: no non-constant polynomial function P(n) exists that evaluates to a prime number for almost all integers n.

Euler first noticed (in 1772) that the quadratic polynomial

$$P(n) = n^2 + n + 41$$

is prime for the 40 integers $n=0, 1, 2, \dots, 39$ with corresponding primes $41, 43, 47, 53, 61, 71, \dots, 1601$. The differences between the terms are $2, 4, 6, 8, 10\dots$ For $n=40$, it produces a square number, $1681$, which is equal to $41\times 41$, the smallest composite number for this formula for $n\ge 0$. If $41$ divides $n$, it divides $P(n)$ too. Furthermore, since $P(n)$ can be written as $n(n+1)+41$, if $41$ divides $n+1$ instead, it also divides $P(n)$. The phenomenon is related to the Ulam spiral, which is also implicitly quadratic, and the class number; this polynomial is related to the Heegner number $163=4\cdot 41-1$. There are analogous polynomials for $p=2, 3, 5, 11 \text{ and } 17$ (the lucky numbers of Euler), corresponding to other Heegner numbers.

Given a positive integer $S$, there may be infinitely many $c$ such that the expression $n^2 + n + c$ is always coprime to $S$. The integer $c$ may be negative, in which case there is a delay before primes are produced.

Similarly, other polynomials (of higher degree) produces finite sequences of prime numbers. In 2010, Dress and Landreau found the following polynomial representing a record-breaking 58 primes at consecutive values:
$$Q(n) = \frac1{72}n^6 - \frac5{24}n^5 - \frac{1493}{72}n^4 + \frac{1027}8n^3 + \frac{100471}{18}n^2 - \frac{11971}6n - 57347$$
More precisely, $|Q(n)|$ is prime for $n$ ranging from -42 to 15.

It is known, based on Dirichlet's theorem on arithmetic progressions, that linear polynomial functions $L(n) = an + b$ produce infinitely many primes as long as $a$ and $b$ are relatively prime (though no such function will assume prime values for all values of $n$). Moreover, the Green–Tao theorem says that for any $k$ there exists a pair of a and b, with the property that $L(n) = an+b$ is prime for any $n$ from 0 through $k-1$. However, as of 2020, the best known result of such type is for $k=27$:

$$224584605939537911 + 18135696597948930n$$

is prime for all $n$ from 0 through 26. (Note: PrimeGrid, "PrimeGrid's AP27 Search, Official announcement" (PDF), PrimeGrid The AP27 is listed in "Jens Kruse Andersen's Primes in Arithmetic Progression Records page") It is not even known whether there exists a univariate polynomial of degree at least 2, that assumes an infinite number of values that are prime; see Bunyakovsky conjecture.

== Rowland's prime-generating sequence ==
Another prime generator is defined by the recurrence relation

$$a_n = a_{n-1} + \gcd(n,a_{n-1}), \quad a_1 = 7,$$

where $\gcd$ denotes the greatest common divisor function. The sequence of differences $a_{n+1} - a_n$ starts with 1, 1, 1, 5, 3, 1, 1, 1, 1, 11, 3, 1, 1, 1, 1, 1, 1, 1, 1, 1, 1, 23, 3, 1, 1, 1, 1, 1, 1, 1, 1, 1, 1, 1, 1, 1, 1, 1, 1, 1, 1, 1, 1, 1, 1, 47, 3, 1, 5, 3, ... (sequence A132199 in the OEIS). Rowland (2008) proved that this sequence contains only ones and prime numbers. However, it does not contain all the prime numbers, since the terms $\gcd(n+1, a_n)$ are always odd and so never equal to 2. The same paper conjectures that the sequence contains all odd primes: in fact, 587 is the smallest odd prime not appearing in the first 10,000 outcomes different from 1.

This recurrence is rather inefficient. In perspective, it is trivial to write an algorithm to generate all prime numbers (from the definition), and many more efficient algorithms are known. Thus, such recurrence relations are more a matter of curiosity than of practical use.

== Prime-describing system of Diophantine equations ==
Because the set of primes is a computably enumerable set, by Matiyasevich's theorem, it can be obtained from a system of Diophantine equations. Jones et al. (1976) found an explicit set of 14 Diophantine equations in 26 variables $a, b, ..., z$, such that a given number $k+2$ is prime if and only if that system has a solution in nonnegative integers:

$$\begin{align}
\alpha_0 &= wz + h + j - q  = 0 \\
\alpha_1 &= (gk + 2g + k + 1)(h + j) + h - z  = 0 \\
\alpha_2 &= 16(k + 1)^3(k + 2)(n + 1)^2 + 1 - f^2  = 0 \\
\alpha_3 &= 2n + p + q + z - e  = 0 \\
\alpha_4 &= e^3(e + 2)(a + 1)^2 + 1 - o^2 = 0 \\
\alpha_5 &= (a^2 - 1)y^2 + 1 - x^2 = 0 \\
\alpha_6 &= 16r^2y^4(a^2 - 1) + 1 - u^2 = 0 \\
\alpha_7 &= n + \ell + v - y = 0 \\
\alpha_8 &= (a^2 - 1)\ell^2 + 1 - m^2 = 0 \\
\alpha_9 &= ai + k + 1 - \ell - i = 0 \\
\alpha_{10} &= ((a + u^2(u^2 - a))^2 - 1)(n + 4dy)^2 + 1 - (x + cu)^2 = 0 \\
\alpha_{11} &= p + \ell(a - n - 1) + b(2an + 2a - n^2 - 2n - 2) - m = 0 \\
\alpha_{12} &= q + y(a - p - 1) + s(2ap + 2a - p^2 - 2p - 2) - x = 0 \\
\alpha_{13} &= z + p\ell(a - p) + t(2ap - p^2 - 1) - pm = 0
\end{align}$$

The 14 equations $\alpha_0, \dots, \alpha_{13}$ can be used to produce a prime-generating polynomial inequality in 26 variables:

$$(k+2)(1-\alpha_0^2-\alpha_1^2-\cdots-\alpha_{13}^2) > 0$$

is a polynomial inequality in 26 variables, and the set of prime numbers is identical to the set of positive values taken on by the left-hand side as the variables $a, b, ..., z$ range over the nonnegative integers.

A general theorem of Matiyasevich says that if a set is defined by a system of Diophantine equations, it can also be defined by a system of Diophantine equations in only 9 variables. Hence, there is a prime-generating polynomial inequality as above with only 10 variables. However, its degree is large (in the order of 10^{45}). On the other hand, there also exists such a set of equations of degree only 4, but in 58 variables.

== See also ==
- Prime number theorem
