= Six nines in pi =

Sequence of digits in the math constant π, incorrectly attributed to Feynman

A sequence of six consecutive nines occurs in the decimal representation of the number pi (π), starting at the 762nd decimal place. It has become famous because of the mathematical coincidence, and because of the idea that one could memorize the digits of π up to that point, and then jokingly suggest that π is rational. The earliest known mention of this idea occurs in Douglas Hofstadter's 1985 book Metamagical Themas, where Hofstadter states

I myself once learned 380 digits of π, when I was a crazy high-school kid. My never-attained ambition was to reach the spot, 762 digits out in the decimal expansion, where it goes "999999", so that I could recite it out loud, come to those six 9s, and then impishly say, "and so on!"

This sequence of six nines is colloquially known as the "Feynman point", after physicist Richard Feynman, who allegedly stated this same idea in a lecture. However it is not clear when, or even if, Feynman ever made such a statement, as it is neither mentioned in his memoirs nor is it known to his biographer James Gleick.

== Related statistics ==
It is widely conjectured that π is a normal number. For a normal number sampled uniformly at random, the probability of a specific sequence of six digits occurring this early in the decimal representation is about 0.08%.

The early string of six 9s is also the first occurrence of four and five consecutive identical digits. The next sequence of six consecutive identical digits is again composed of 9s, starting at position 193,034. The next distinct sequence of six consecutive identical digits after that starts with the digit 8 at position 222,299.

The positions of the first occurrence of a string of 1, 2, 3, 4, 5, 6, 7, 8, and 9 consecutive 9s in the decimal expansion are 5; 44; 762; 762; 762; 762; 1,722,776; 36,356,642; and 564,665,206, respectively (sequence A048940 in the OEIS).

== Decimal expansion ==
The first 1,001 digits of π (1,000 decimal places), showing consecutive runs of three or more digits including the consecutive six 9s underlined, are as follows:

3.1415926535 8979323846 2643383279 5028841971 6939937510 5820974944 5923078164 0628620899 8628034825 3421170679 8214808651 3282306647 0938446095 5058223172 5359408128 4811174502 8410270193 8521105559 6446229489 5493038196 4428810975 6659334461 2847564823 3786783165 2712019091 4564856692 3460348610 4543266482 1339360726 0249141273 7245870066 0631558817 4881520920 9628292540 9171536436 7892590360 0113305305 4882046652 1384146951 9415116094 3305727036 5759591953 0921861173 8193261179 3105118548 0744623799 6274956735 1885752724 8912279381 8301194912 9833673362 4406566430 8602139494 6395224737 1907021798 6094370277 0539217176 2931767523 8467481846 7669405132 0005681271 4526356082 7785771342 7577896091 7363717872 1468440901 2249534301 4654958537 1050792279 6892589235 4201995611 2129021960 8640344181 5981362977 4771309960 5187072113 4999999837 2978049951 0597317328 1609631859 5024459455 3469083026 4252230825 3344685035 2619311881 7101000313 7838752886 5875332083 8142061717 7669147303 5982534904 2875546873 1159562863 8823537875 9375195778 1857780532 1712268066 1300192787 6611195909 2164201989

== See also ==
- 0.999...
- 9 (number)
- Mathematical coincidence
- Repdigit
- Ramanujan's constant
