= Lucky numbers of Euler =

Mathematical concept

Euler's "lucky" numbers are positive integers n such that for all integers k with 1 ≤ k < n, the polynomial k^{2} − k + n produces a prime number.

== Characteristics ==
When k is equal to n, the value cannot be prime since n^{2} − n + n = n^{2} is divisible by n. Since the polynomial can be written as k(k−1) + n, using the integers k with −(n−1) < k ≤ 0 produces the same set of numbers as 1 ≤ k < n. These polynomials are all members of the larger set of prime generating polynomials.

Leonhard Euler published the polynomial k^{2} − k + 41 which produces prime numbers for all integer values of k from 1 to 40. As established by Kurt Heegner in 1952, only 6 lucky numbers of Euler exist, namely 2, 3, 5, 11, 17 and 41 (sequence A014556 in the OEIS). Note that these numbers are all prime numbers.

The primes of the form k^{2} − k + 41 are

41, 43, 47, 53, 61, 71, 83, 97, 113, 131, 151, 173, 197, 223, 251, 281, 313, 347, 383, 421, 461, 503, 547, 593, 641, 691, 743, 797, 853, 911, 971, ... (sequence A005846 in the OEIS).

== Other lucky numbers ==
Euler's lucky numbers are unrelated to the "lucky numbers" defined by a sieve algorithm. In fact, the only number which is both lucky and Euler-lucky is 3, since all other Euler-lucky numbers are congruent to 2 modulo 3, but no lucky numbers are congruent to 2 modulo 3.

== See also ==
- Heegner number
- List of topics named after Leonhard Euler
- Formula for primes
- Ulam spiral

== Literature ==
- Le Lionnais, F. Les Nombres Remarquables. Paris: Hermann, pp. 88 and 144, 1983.
- Leonhard Euler, Extrait d'un lettre de M. Euler le pere à M. Bernoulli concernant le Mémoire imprimé parmi ceux de 1771, p. 318 (1774). Euler Archive - All Works. 461.
