= Strong law of small numbers =

Humorous mathematical law

In mathematics, the "strong law of small numbers" is the humorous law that proclaims, in the words of Richard K. Guy (1980, 1988):

There aren't enough small numbers to meet the many demands made of them.

In other words, any given small number appears in far more contexts than may seem reasonable, leading to many apparently surprising coincidences in mathematics, simply because small numbers appear so often and yet are so few. Guy's 1988 paper gives numerous examples in support of this thesis and earned him the AMA Lester R. Ford Award in 1989.

== Second strong law of small numbers ==
Guy gives Moser's circle problem as an example. The number of points (n), chords (c) and regions (r_{G}). The first five terms for the number of regions follow a simple sequence, broken by the sixth term.

Guy also formulated a second strong law of small numbers:

When two numbers look equal, it ain't necessarily so!

Guy explains this latter law by the way of examples: he cites numerous sequences for which observing the first few members may lead to a wrong guess about the generating formula or law for the sequence. Many of the examples are the observations of other mathematicians.

One example Guy gives is the conjecture that 2^{p} − 1 is prime—in fact, a Mersenne prime—when p is prime; but this conjecture, while true for p = 2, 3, 5 and 7, fails for p = 11, 23, 29, ....

Another relates to the prime number race: primes congruent to 3 modulo 4 appear to be more numerous than those congruent to 1; however this is false, and first ceases being true at 26861.

A geometric example concerns Moser's circle problem (pictured), which appears to have the solution of 2^{n−1} for n points, but this pattern breaks at and above n = 6.

== See also ==
- Insensitivity to sample size
- Law of large numbers (unrelated, but the origin of the name)
- Mathematical coincidence
- Pigeonhole principle
- Representativeness heuristic
