= Almost integer =

Any number that is not an integer but is very close to one

Ed Pegg Jr. noted that the length d equals $\sqrt{\left(61421-23\sqrt{5831385}\right)/\,120}$, which is very close to $7$ (approximately $7.0000000857$)

In recreational mathematics, an almost integer (or near-integer) is any number that is not an integer but is very close to one. Almost integers may be considered interesting when they arise in some context in which they are unexpected.

== Almost integers relating to the golden ratio and Fibonacci numbers ==
Some examples of almost integers are high powers of the golden ratio $\phi=\frac{1+\sqrt5}{2}\approx 1.618$, for example:

$$\begin{align}
\phi^{17} & =\frac{3571+1597\sqrt5}{2}\approx 3571.00028 \\[6pt]
\phi^{18} & =2889+1292\sqrt5 \approx 5777.999827 \\[6pt]
\phi^{19} & =\frac{9349+4181\sqrt5}{2}\approx 9349.000107
\end{align}$$

The fact that these powers approach integers is non-coincidental, because the golden ratio is a Pisot–Vijayaraghavan number.

The ratios of Fibonacci or Lucas numbers can also make almost integers, for instance:

- $\frac{\operatorname{Fibonacci}(360)}{\operatorname{Fibonacci}(216)} \approx 1242282009792667284144565908481.999999999999999999999999999999195$
- $\frac{\operatorname{Lucas}(361)}{\operatorname{Lucas}(216)} \approx 2010054515457065378082322433761.000000000000000000000000000000497$

The above examples can be generalized by the following sequences, which generate near-integers approaching Lucas numbers with increasing precision:

- $a(n) = \frac{\operatorname{Fibonacci}(45\times2^n)}{\operatorname{Fibonacci}(27\times2^n)} \approx \operatorname{Lucas}(18\times2^n)$
- $a(n) = \frac{\operatorname{Lucas}(45\times2^n+1)}{\operatorname{Lucas}(27\times2^n)} \approx \operatorname{Lucas}(18\times2^n+1)$

As n increases, the number of consecutive nines or zeros beginning at the tenths place of a(n) approaches infinity.

== Almost integers relating to e and π ==
Other occurrences of non-coincidental near-integers involve the three largest Heegner numbers:

- $e^{\pi\sqrt{43}}\approx 8847\,36743.99977\,7466$
- $e^{\pi\sqrt{67}}\approx 14\,71979\,52743.99999\,86624\,54$
- $e^{\pi\sqrt{163}}\approx 262\,53741\,26407\,68743.99999\,99999\,99250\,07$

where the non-coincidence can be better appreciated when expressed in the common simple form:

$$e^{\pi\sqrt{43}} = 12^3(9^2-1)^3 + 744 \ -\  2.225\ldots\cdot 10^{- 4}$$
$$e^{\pi\sqrt{67}} = 12^3(21^2-1)^3 + 744 \ -\  1.337\ldots\cdot 10^{- 6}$$
$$e^{\pi\sqrt{163}} = 12^3(          231^2-1)^3 + 744 \ -\  7.499\ldots\cdot 10^{-13}$$

where

$$21=3 \cdot 7, \quad 231 = 3 \cdot 7 \cdot 11, \quad 744 = 24 \cdot 31$$

and the reason for the squares is due to certain Eisenstein series. The constant $e^{\pi\sqrt{163}}$ is sometimes referred to as Ramanujan's constant.

Almost integers that involve the mathematical constants π and e have often puzzled mathematicians. An example is: $e^\pi - \pi = 19.99909\,99791\,89\ldots$ This can be explained using a sum related to Jacobi theta functions as follows:
$$\sum_{k=1}^{\infty}\left( 8\pi k^2 -2 \right) e^{-\pi k^2} = 1.$$
The first term dominates since the sum of the terms for $k\geq 2$ total $\sim 0.00034\,36.$ The sum can therefore be truncated to $\left( 8\pi -2\right) e^{-\pi}\approx 1,$ where solving for $e^{\pi}$ gives $e^{\pi} \approx 8\pi -2.$ Rewriting the approximation for $e^{\pi}$ and using the approximation for $7\pi \approx 22$ gives
$$e^{\pi} \approx \pi + 7\pi - 2 \approx \pi + 22-2 = \pi+20.$$
Thus, rearranging terms gives $e^{\pi} - \pi \approx 20.$ Ironically, the crude approximation for $7\pi$ yields an additional order of magnitude of precision.

Another example involving these constants is: $e+\pi+e\pi+e^\pi+\pi^e=59.99945\,90558\ldots$

== See also ==
- 744 (number)
- Schizophrenic number
