= Lowest common denominator =

Lowest common multiple of the denominators of a set of fractions

In mathematics, the lowest common denominator or least common denominator (abbreviated LCD) is the lowest common multiple of the denominators of a set of fractions. It simplifies adding, subtracting, and comparing fractions.

== Description ==
The lowest common denominator of a set of fractions is the lowest number that is a multiple of all the denominators: their lowest common multiple. The product of the denominators is always a common denominator, as in:

$$\frac{1}{2}+\frac{2}{3}\;=\;\frac{3}{6}+\frac{4}{6}\;=\;\frac{7}{6}$$

but it is not always the lowest common denominator, as in:

$$\frac{5}{12}+\frac{11}{18}\;=\;\frac{15}{36}+\frac{22}{36}\;=\;\frac{37}{36}$$

Here, 36 is the least common multiple of 12 and 18. Their product, 216, is also a common denominator, but calculating with that denominator involves larger numbers:

$$\frac{5}{12}+\frac{11}{18}=\frac{90}{216}+\frac{132}{216}=\frac{222}{216}.$$

With variables rather than numbers, the same principles apply:

$$\frac{a}{bc}+\frac{c}{b^2 d}\;=\;\frac{abd}{b^2 cd}+\frac{c^2}{b^2 cd}\;=\;\frac{abd+c^2}{b^2 cd}$$

Some methods of calculating the LCD are at Least common multiple § Calculation.

== Role in arithmetic and algebra ==
The same fraction can be expressed in many different forms. As long as the ratio between numerator and denominator is the same, the fractions represent the same number. For example:

$$\frac{2}{3}=\frac{6}{9}=\frac{12}{18}=\frac{144}{216}=\frac{200,000}{300,000}$$

because they are all multiplied by 1 written as a fraction:

$$\frac{2}{3}=\frac{2}{3}\times\frac{3}{3}=\frac{2}{3}\times\frac{6}{6}=\frac{2}{3}\times\frac{72}{72}=\frac{2}{3}\times\frac{100,000}{100,000}.$$

It is usually easiest to add, subtract, or compare fractions when each is expressed with the same denominator, called a "common denominator". For example, the numerators of fractions with common denominators can simply be added, such that $\frac{5}{12}+\frac{6}{12}=\frac{11}{12}$ and that $\frac{5}{12}<\frac{11}{12}$, since each fraction has the common denominator 12. Without computing a common denominator, it is not obvious as to what $\frac{5}{12}+\frac{11}{18}$ equals, or whether $\frac{5}{12}$ is greater than or less than $\frac{11}{18}$. Any common denominator will do, but usually the lowest common denominator is desirable because it makes the rest of the calculation as simple as possible.

== Practical uses ==
The LCD has many practical uses, such as determining the number of objects of two different lengths necessary to align them in a row which starts and ends at the same place, such as in brickwork, tiling, and tessellation. It is also useful in planning work schedules with employees with y days off every x days.

In musical rhythm, the LCD is used in cross-rhythms and polymeters to determine the fewest notes necessary to count time given two or more metric divisions. For example, much African music is recorded in Western notation using 12/8 because each measure is divided by 4 and by 3, the LCD of which is 12.

== Metaphorical use ==
As a metaphor, common denominator can be used in various contexts to refer to a solution that works for every stakeholder, something that is true of everyone or everything involved, the shared cause of the events being referenced, etc. The phrase lowest common denominator is often used negatively to describe something that is not very good, but just enough to meet everyone's requirements, thereby criticizing its producer for only doing the bare minimum, or for creating something that is bland and generic, rather than risking turning away a few people in order to produce a better result for everyone else. It may also refer to something that is simplified to appeal to the masses rather than being more nuanced and sophisticated. These terms are often used in engineering to refer to the set of features that are available in all related products or target systems, forming an implicit standard for compatibility. These usages may not be literally correct, but the words "low(est)", "common", and "denominator" (literally 'namer', but perhaps relating to the bottom part or foundation, as of a fraction) nevertheless carry the correct connotations.

== See also ==
- Anomalous cancellation
- Greatest common divisor
- Partial fraction decomposition, reverses the process of adding fractions into uncommon denominators
