= Anomalous cancellation =

Kind of arithmetic error

$\begin{array}{l} \;\;\; \dfrac {d} {dx} \dfrac{1}{x} \\ = \dfrac {d} {d} \dfrac{1}{x^2} \\ = \dfrac{\cancel{d}}{\cancel{d}} \dfrac{1}{x^2} \\ = - \dfrac{1}{x^2} \end{array}$
Anomalous cancellation in calculus

An anomalous cancellation or accidental cancellation is a particular kind of arithmetic procedural error that gives a numerically correct answer. An attempt is made to reduce a fraction by cancelling individual digits in the numerator and denominator. This is not a legitimate operation, and does not in general give a correct answer, but in some rare cases the result is numerically the same as if a correct procedure had been applied. The trivial cases of cancelling trailing zeros or where all of the digits are equal are ignored.

Examples of anomalous cancellations which still produce the correct result include:

- $\frac{19}{95} = \frac{1\cancel{9}}{\cancel{9}5} = \frac{1}{5}$
- $\frac{16}{64} = \frac{1\cancel{6}}{\cancel{6}4} = \frac{1}{4}$
- $\frac{26}{65} = \frac{2\cancel{6}}{\cancel{6}5} = \frac{2}{5}$
- $\frac{49}{98} = \frac{4\cancel{9}}{\cancel{9}8} = \frac{4}{8} = \frac{1}{2}.$

These and their inverses are all the cases in base 10 with the fraction different from 1 and with two digits. The article by Boas analyzes two-digit cases in bases other than base 10, e.g., 32/13 = 2/1 and its inverse are the only solutions in base 4 with two digits.

An example of anomalous cancellation with more than two digits is 165/462 = 15/42, and an example with different numbers of digits is 98/392=8/32.

== Elementary properties ==
When the base is prime, no two-digit solutions exist. This can be proven by contradiction: suppose a solution exists. Without loss of generality, we can say that this solution is

$$\frac{a||b}{c||a}=\frac{b}{c},\ {\rm base}\ p,$$

where the double vertical line indicates digit concatenation. Thus, we have

$$\frac{ap+b}{cp+a}=\frac{b}{c}\implies (a-b)cp=b(a-c)$$

But $p>a,b,a-c$, as they are digits in base $p$; yet $p$ divides $b(a-c)$, which means that $a=c$. Therefore. the right hand side is zero, which means the left hand side must also be zero, i.e., $a=b$, a contradiction by the definition of the problem. (If $a=b$, the calculation becomes $\frac{a||a}{c||a}=\frac{a}{c} \implies \frac{a||a}{a||a}=\frac{a}{a}=1$, which is one of the excluded trivial cases.)

Another property is that the numbers of solutions in a base $n$ is odd if and only if $n$ is an even square. This can be proven similarly to the above: suppose that we have a solution

$$\frac{a||b}{c||a}=\frac{b}{c}$$

Then, doing the same manipulation, we get

$$\frac{an+b}{cn+a}=\frac{b}{c}\implies (a-b)cn=b(a-c)$$

Suppose that $a>b,c$. Then note that $a,b,c\to a,a-c,a-b$ is also a solution to the equation. This almost sets up an involution from the set of solutions to itself. But we can also substitute in to get $(a-b)^2n=b^2$, which only has solutions when $n$ is a square. Let $n=k^2$. Taking square roots and rearranging yields $ak=(k+1)b$. Since the greatest common divisor of $k,(k+1)$ is one, we know that $a=(k+1)x,b=kx$. Noting that $a,b<k^2$, this has precisely the solutions $x=1,2,3,\ldots,k-1$: i.e., it has an odd number of solutions when $n=k^2$ is an even square. The converse of the statement may be proven by noting that these solutions all satisfy the initial requirements.

The question in a bit more generality was studied by Satvik Saha, Sohom Gupta, Sayan Dutta and Sourin Chatterjee. The number of solutions in different bases are listed in OEIS A366412.

== See also ==
- Howler (mathematics)
- Mathematical joke
