= David Savitt (mathematician) =

Canadian-American mathematician

- Education: University of British Columbia; Harvard University
- Awards: Presidential Early Career Award for Scientists and Engineers
- Scientific career
- Fields: Mathematics
- Workplaces: University of Arizona; Johns Hopkins University
- Doctoral advisor: Richard Taylor

David Savitt is a Canadian-American mathematician working in algebraic number theory and arithmetic aspects of the Langlands Program.

Savitt received the Presidential Early Career Award for Scientists and Engineers (PECASE) in 2014, and was named a Fellow of the American Mathematical Society in 2017.

== Career ==
Savitt earned his Bachelor's degree in 1996 from the University of British Columbia. After completing his doctorate at Harvard University in 2001 under the supervision of Richard Taylor, he held postdoctoral fellowships at McGill University and IHÉS From 2005 to 2015 he served on the faculty of the University of Arizona, after which he moved to Johns Hopkins, where he has been department chair since 2018.

With Toby Gee and Tong Liu, he proved the weight part of Serre's conjecture for Hilbert modular forms, and with Matthew Emerton and Toby Gee he proved Breuil's conjecture on local-global compatibility for lattices in the cohomology of Shimura curves.

== Outreach ==
Savitt is a director of Canada/USA Mathcamp, an academic summer program for middle and high school students in mathematics, where he was also an instructor for many years.
