= Annals of Mathematics Studies =

Graduate-level textbooks in mathematics

Annals of Mathematics Studies is a series of mathematical books published by the Princeton University Press beginning in 1940.

When the Institute for Advanced Study opened in 1933, its professors would give courses of lectures where notes were taken and written up. Originally these were mimeographed and distributed by the Princeton University math department. When Albert W. Tucker joined the department, he was put in charge of the mimographing machine, which eventually turned into coordinating coordinating all of the note taking process. In 1940 the Annals of Mathematics Studies was founded to publish these notes. Tucker has said "And I must say that through all the various things that I've had a hand in here at Princeton, there is nothing that gives me greater pride than Annals of Mathematics Studies."

Many winners of the Fields Medal, which is frequently referred to as the Nobel prize of mathematics, have authored books in this series, including Vladimir Voevodsky, Gerd Faltings, Pierre Deligne, Curtis McMullen, Jean Bourgain, Peter Scholze, David Mumford, and John Milnor. There are also books authored by winners of the Steele Prize for Mathematical Exposition, including William Fulton, David Eisenbud, François Trèves, and Elias M. Stein.

== List of books ==
Volume	Title	Author(s)	Publication Date	Pages	ISBN/LCCN
1	Algebraic Theory of Numbers	Hermann Weyl	1940	223	LCCN 40-13494
2	Convergence and Uniformity in Topology	John Tukey	1941-01-20	90	978-0691095684
3	Consistency of the Continuum Hypothesis.	Kurt Gödel	1940-09-01	72	978-0691079271
4	An Introduction to Linear Transformations in Hilbert Space.	F. J. Murray	1941	135	978-0691095691
5	The Two-Valued Iterative Systems of Mathematical Logic.	Emil L. Post	1941-01-20	122	978-0527027216
6	The Calculi of Lambda Conversion.	Alonzo Church	1941	77	9780527027223
7	Finite Dimensional Vector Spaces.	Paul R. Halmos	1947-01-21	196	978-0691090955
8	Metric Methods of Finsler Spaces and in the Foundations of Geometry.	Herbert Busemann	1943-01-20	243	978-0691095714
9	Degree of Approximation by Polynomials in the Complex Domain.	W. E. Sewell	1943-01-20	248	978-0691095721
10	Topics in Topology.	Solomon Lefschetz	1943-01-20	137	978-0691095738
11	Introduction to Non-Linear Mechanics.	N. Kryloff, N. Bogoliuboff	1950-01-20	106	978-0691079851
12	Meromorphic Functions and Analytic Curves.	Hermann Weyl, In collaboration with F. Jaochim Weyl	1944	269	978-0691095745
14	Lectures on Differential Equations	Solomon Lefschetz	1946	209	LCCN a460-5010
15	Topological Methods in the Theory of Functions of a Complex Variable.	Marston Morse	1948	145	978-0691095028
16	Transcendental Numbers.	Carl Ludwig Siegel	1950	102	978-0691095752
17	Probleme General de la Stabilite du Mouvement.	M. A. Liapounoff	1948	474	978-0691095769
18	An Essay Toward a Unified Theory of Special Functions.	C. Truesdell	1949	182	978-0691095776
19	Fourier Transforms.	S. Bochner, K. Chandrasekharan	1950	219	978-0691095783
20	Contributions to the Theory of Nonlinear Oscillations, Volume I	Edited by Solomon Lefschetz	1950-04-21	360	978-0691079318
21	Functional Operators (AM-21), Volume 1: Measures and Integrals	John Von Neumann	1950-01-21	268	9780691079660
22	Functional Operators (AM-22), Volume 2: The Geometry of Orthogonal Spaces.	John Von Neumann	1951	116	978-0691095790
23	Existence Theorems in Partial Differential Equations.	Dorothy L. Bernstein	1951-01-20	228	978-0691095806
24	Contributions to the Theory of Games Vol I	Edited by H. W. Kuhn and A.W. Tucker	1950-12-21	404	978-0691079349
25	Contributions to Fourier Analysis.	A. Zygmund, W. Transue, M. Morse, A. P. Calderon, S. Bochner|	1950-08-21	196	978-0691079301
26	A Theory of Cross-Spaces	Robert Schatten	1950	153	LCCN 50-14439
27	Isoperimetric Inequalities in Mathematical Physics.	G. Pólya, G. Szegö	1951	279	978-0691079882
28	Contributions to the Theory of Games, Volume II	Edited by H. W. Kuhn and A.W. Tucker	1953-02-21	408	978-0691079356
29	Contributions to the Theory of Nonlinear Oscillations, Volume II	Edited by S. Lefschetz	1953	128	978-0691095813
30	Contributions to the Theory of Riemann Surfaces.	Edited by Lars Valerian Ahlfors, E. Calabi, Marston Morse, Leo Sario, and Donald Spencer	1953-08-01	264	978-1400828371
31	Order-Preserving Maps and Integration Processes.	Edward J. McShane	1954	136	978-0691095820
32	Curvature and Betti Numbers.	K. Yano, S. Bochner	1954-01-20	190	978-0691095837
33	Contributions to the Theory of Partial Differential Equations.	Lipman Bers; Salomon Bochner; Fritz John	1955-01-20	257	978-0691095844
34	Automata Studies.	C. E. Shannon, et al	1956-04-21	285	978-0691079165
35	Surface Area	Lamberto Cesari	1957-01-20	595	9780691095851
36	Contributions to the Theory of Nonlinear Oscillations, Volume III	Edited by S. Lefschetz	1956-01-21	296	9780691079110
37	Lectures on the Theory of Games	Harold W. Kuhn	2003-02-01	120	978-0691027715
38	Linear Inequalities and Related Systems.	Harold W. Kuhn and Albert William Tucker, eds	1956-10-21	352	9780691079998
39	Contributions to the Theory of Games, Volume III	Albert William Tucker, Philip Wolfe	1957-11-21	448	9780691079363
40	Contributions to the Theory of Games IV	Edited by A. W. Tucker, R. D. Luce	1959-05-21	468	9780691079370
41	Contributions to the Theory of Nonlinear Oscillations, IV	Edited by S. Lefschetz	1958-09-21	224	9780691079325
42	Lectures on Fourier Integrals	Salomon Bochner	1959-09-21	333	978-0691079943
43	Ramification Theoretic Methods in Algebraic Geometry	Shreeram Abhyankar	1959	112	9780691080239
44	Stationary Processes and Prediction Theory.	Harry Furstenberg	1960-08-21	296	9780691080413
45	Contributions to the Theory of Nonlinear Oscillations Vol V	Lamberto Cesari, J. LaSalle, Solomon Lefschetz eds	1960-01-21	304	9780691079332
46	Seminar on Transformation Groups.	Armand Borel	1960-08-21	256	9780691080307
47	Theory of Formal Systems.	Raymond M. Smullyan	1961	156	9780691080475
48	Lectures on Modular Forms.	R. C. Gunning	1962-03-01	96	978-0691079950
49	Composition Methods in Homotopy Groups of Spheres.	Hirosi Toda	1963	193	9780691095868
50	Cohomology Operations: Lectures by N. E. Steenrod	David B. A. Epstein	1962-10-21	138	9780691079240
51	Morse Theory.	J. Milnor	1963	160	978-0691080086
52	Advances in Game Theory.	Edited by Melvin Dresher, Lloyd S. Shapley, and Albert William Tucker	1964-06-21	691	9780691079028
53	Flows on Homogeneous Spaces.	L. Auslander, L. Green, F. Hahn	1963-05-21	107	9780691079639
54	Elementary Differential Topology.	James R. Munkres	1967-01-20	112	978-0691090931
55	Degrees of Unsolvability.	Gerald E. Sacks	1963-10-21	192	978-0691079417
56	Knot Groups	L. P. Neuwirth	1965-01-01	113	9780691079912
57	Seminar on Atiyah-Singer Index Theorem.	Richard S. Palais	1965-09-21	376	9780691080314
58	Continuous Model Theory.	Chang Chen Chung, H. Jerome Keisler	1966-06-21	165	9780691079295
59	Lectures on Curves on an Algebraic Surface.	David Mumford	1966-08-21	212	978-0691079936
60	Topology Seminar Wisconsin, 1965.	Edited by R. H. Bing and Ralph J. Bean	1966-11-21	256	9780691080567
61	Singular Points of Complex Hypersurfaces.	John Milnor	1969-01-21	130	978-0691080659
62	Generalized Feynman Amplitudes	Eugene R. Speer	1969-04-21	312	9780691080666
63	Topics in Harmonic Analysis Related to the Littlewood-Paley Theory	Elias M. Stein	1970-02-21	160	9780691080673
64	The Equidistribution Theory of Holomorphic Curves	Hung-Hsi Wu	1970-02-21	250	978-0691080734
66	Advances in the Theory of Riemann Surfaces.	Edited by Lars V. Ahlfors, Lipman Bers	1971-07-21	430	9780691080819
67	Profinite Groups, Arithmetic, and Geometry.	Stephen S. Shatz	1972-03-21	264	9780691080178
68	On Group-Theoretic Decision Problems and Their Classification.	Charles F. Miller	1971-11-21	106	9780691080918
69	Symposium on Infinite Dimensional Topology.	Edited by R. D. Anderson	1972-03-21	308	978-0691080871
70	Prospects in Mathematics.	F. Hirzebruch, Lars Hörmander, John Milnor, Jean-Pierre Serre, I. M. Singer	1971-11-21	185	978-0691080949
71	Normal Two-Dimensional Singularities.	Henry B. Laufer	1971-11-21	176	978-0691081007
72	Introduction to Algebraic K-Theory.	John Milnor	1972-01-21	200	978-0691081014
73	Lie Equations, Vol. I: General Theory.	Antonio Kumpera, Donald Spencer	1972-10-21	309	9780691081113
74	Lectures on P-Adic L-Functions.	Kenkichi Iwasawa	1972-07-21	112	9780691081120
75	The Neumann Problem for the Cauchy-Riemann Complex.	G. B. Folland, J. J. Kohn	1972-11-21	156	9780691081205
76	Characteristic Classes.	John W. Milnor, James D. Stasheff	1974-08-01	340	9780691081229
78	Strong Rigidity of Locally Symmetric Spaces.	G. D. Mostow	1973-12-21	204	978-0691081366
79	Discontinuous Groups and Riemann Surfaces: Proceedings of the 1973 Conference at the University of Maryland	Edited by Leon Greenberg	1974-04-21	452	978-0691081380
80	Smoothings of Piecewise Linear Manifolds.	Morris W. Hirsch, Barry Mazur	1974-10-21	140	978-0691081458
81	Discrete Series of GLn Over a Finite Field	George Lusztig	1974-10-21	104	9780691081540
82	Braids, Links, and Mapping Class Groups.	Joan S. Birman	1975-02-01	237	978-0691081496
83	Automorphic Forms on Adele Groups.	Stephen S. Gelbart	1975-03-21	227	978-0691081564
84	Knots, Groups and 3-Manifolds: Papers Dedicated to the Memory of R.H. Fox	Edited by L. P. Neuwirth	1975-06-30	334	978-0691081670
85	Entire Holomorphic Mappings in One and Several Complex Variables	Phillip A. Griffiths	1976-02-21	110	9780691081724
87	Scattering Theory for Automorphic Functions.	Peter D. Lax, Ralph S. Phillips	1977-01-21	312	978-0691081847
88	Foundational Essays on Topological Manifolds, Smoothings, and Triangulations.	Robion C. Kirby, Laurence C. Siebenmann	1977-05-21	368	978-0691081915
89	Invariant Forms on Grassmann Manifolds.	Wilhelm Stoll	1978-01-21	128	978-0691081991
90	Infinite Loop Spaces: Hermann Weyl Lectures, The Institute for Advanced Study	J. F. Adams	1978-09-01	230	978-1400821259
91	Seminar on Singularities of Solutions of Linear Partial Differential Equations.	Edited by Lars Hörmander	1979-07-21	296	978-0691082134
92	Classifying Spaces for Surgery and Corbordism of Manifolds.	Ib Madsen, R. James Milgram	1979-11-21	284	978-0691082264
93	Seminar on Micro-Local Analysis.	Victor W. Guillemin, Masaki Kashiwara, Takahiro Kawai	1979-11-21	152	978-0691082325
95	C*-Algebra Extensions and K-Homology.	Ronald G. Douglas	1980-97-21	96	978-0691082660
97	Riemann Surfaces and Related Topics: Proceedings of the 1978 Stony Brook Conference	Irwin Kra, Bernard Maskit	1981-05-21	528	978-0691082677
98	K-Theory of Forms.	Anthony Bak	1981-11-21	280	978-0691082752
99	The Spectral Theory of Toeplitz Operators.	L. Boutet De Monvel, V. Guillemin	1981-08-21	166	978-0691082790
100	Recent Developments in Several Complex Variables.	Edited by John E. Fornaess	1981-08-21	464	978-0691082813
101	Random Fourier Series with Applications to Harmonic Analysis	Michael B. Marcus, Gilles Pisier	1981-11-21	152	978-0691082929
102	Seminar on Differential Geometry.	Edited by Yau Shing-Tung	1982-03-21	720	978-0691082967
103	Seminar On Minimal Submanifolds.	Edited by Enrico Bombieri	1984-01-21	368	978-0691083193
104	Etale Homotopy of Simplicial Schemes	Eric M. Friedlander	1982-12-01	191	978-0691083179
105	Multiple Integrals in the Calculus of Variations and Nonlinear Elliptic Systems.	Mariano Giaquinta	1983-11-21	296	978-0691083315
106	Topics in Transcendental Algebraic Geometry.	Edited by Phillip Griffiths	1984-06-21	328	978-0691083391
107	Characters of Reductive Groups over a Finite Field.	GEORGE LUSZTIG	1984-06-21	408	978-0691083513
108	Arithmetic Moduli of Elliptic Curves.	Nicholas M. Katz, Barry Mazur	1985-02-21	528	978-0691083520
109	Functional Integration and Partial Differential Equations.	MARK FREIDLIN	1985-08-21	560	978-0691083629
110	Three-Dimensional Link Theory and Invariants of Plane Curve Singularities.	David Eisenbud, Walter Neumann	1986-01-21	180	978-0691083810
111	Combinatorial Group Theory and Topology.	Edited by S. M. Gersten, John R. Stallings	1987-05-21	551	978-0691084107
112	Beijing Lectures in Harmonic Analysis.	Edited by E. M. Stein	1986-11-21	435	978-0691084190
113	Algebraic Topology and Algebraic K-Theory): Proceedings of a Symposium in Honor of John C. Moore	Edited by William Browder	1987-11-21	567	978-0691084268
114	Differential Systems and Isometric Embeddings	Phillip A. Griffiths, Gary R. Jensen	1987-05-21	238	978-0691084305
115	On Knots	Louis H. Kauffman	1987-10-01	498	978-0691084350
116	Gauss Sums, Kloosterman Sums, and Monodromy Groups.	Nicholas M. Katz	1988-08-21	256	978-0691084336
117	Radically Elementary Probability Theory	Edward Nelson	1987-09-01	107	978-0691084749
118	Unitary Representations of Reductive Lie Groups.	David A. Vogan	1987-10-21	319	978-0691084824
119	Calculus on Heisenberg Manifolds.	Richard Beals, Peter Greiner	1988-08-21	208	978-0691085012
120	Simple Algebras, Base Change, and the Advanced Theory of the Trace Formula.	James Arthur, Laurent Clozel	1989-06-21	248	978-0691085180
121	Cosmology in (2 + 1) -Dimensions, Cyclic Models, and Deformations of M2,1.	Victor Guillemin	1989-03-21	240	978-0691085142
122	Harmonic Analysis in Phase Space.	Gerald B. Folland	1989-03-01	288	978-0691085289
123	Automorphic Representation of Unitary Groups in Three Variables.	Jonathan D. Rogawski	1990-09-21	272	978-0691085876
124	Exponential Sums and Differential Equations.	Nicholas M. Katz	1990-09-01	448	978-0691085999
125	Combinatorics of Train Tracks	R. C. Penner, with J. L. Harer	1991-12-03	232	978-0691025315
126	An Extension of Casson's Invariant	Kevin Walker	1992-03-03	150	978-0691025322
127	Lectures on the Arithmetic Riemann-Roch Theorem.	Gerd Faltings	1992-03-03	150	978-0691025322
128	Nilpotence and Periodicity in Stable Homotopy Theory.	Douglas C. Ravenel	1992-10-19	224	978-0691025728
129	The Admissible Dual of GL(N) via Compact Open Subgroups.	Colin J. Bushnell, Philip C. Kutzko	1992-12-14	332	978-0691021140
130	Harmonic Maps and Minimal Immersions with Symmetries: Methods of Ordinary Differential Equations Applied to Elliptic Variational Problems	James Eells, Andrea Ratto	1993-03-22	244	978-0691102498
131	Introduction to Toric Varieties	William Fulton	1993-07-12	180	978-0691000497
132	Commensurabilities among Lattices in PU (1,n).	Pierre Deligne, G. Daniel Mostow	1993-08-23	218	978-0691000961
133	An Introduction to "G"-Functions.	Bernard Dwork, Giovanni Gerotto, Francis J. Sullivan	1994-05-02	352	978-0691036816
134	Temperley-Lieb Recoupling Theory and Invariants of 3-Manifolds	Louis H. Kauffman, Sóstenes L. Lins	1994-07-05	312	978-0691036403
135	Complex Dynamics and Renormalization	Curtis T. McMullen	1994-11-29	214	978-0691029818
136	Hyperfunctions on Hypo-Analytic Manifolds	Paulo D. Cordaro, François Treves	1994-10-03	378	978-0691029924
137	Modern Methods in Complex Analysis: The Princeton Conference in Honor of Gunning and Kohn	Edited by Thomas Bloom, David Catlin, John P. D’Angelo, Yum-Tong Siu	1995-11-13	360	978-0691044286
138	Prospects in Topology: Proceedings of a Conference in Honor of William Browder	Edited by Frank Quinn	1995-12-11	340	978-0691027289
139	Rigid Local Systems	Nicholas M. Katz	1995-12-11	219	978-0691011189
140	Global Surgery Formula for the Casson-Walker Invariant	Christine Lescop	1995-12-22	150	978-0691021324
142	Renormalization and 3-Manifolds Which Fiber over the Circle	Curtis T. McMullen	1996-07-08	253	978-0691011530
143	Cycles, Transfers, and Motivic Homology Theories.	Vladimir Voevodsky, Andrei Suslin, Eric M. Friedlander	2000-04-04	254	978-0691048154
144	The Real Fatou Conjecture	Jacek Graczyk, Grzegorz Świątek	1998-10-05	148	978-0691002583
145	Surveys on Surgery Theory: Volume 1. Papers Dedicated to C. T. C. Wall	Edited by Sylvain Cappell, Andrew Ranicki, Jonathan Rosenberg	1999-12-21	448	978-0691049373
146	The Action Principle and Partial Differential Equations	Demetrios Christodoulou	1999-12-28	328	978-0691049571
147	Euler Systems	Karl Rubin	2000-05-01	240	978-0691050768
148	Triangulated Categories.	Amnon Neeman	2001-02-01	449	978-0691086866
149	Surveys on Surgery Theory: Volume 2. Papers Dedicated to C.T.C. Wall.	Edited by Sylvain Cappell, Andrew Ranicki, Jonathan Rosenberg	2001-02-01	380	978-0691088150
150	Twisted L-Functions and Monodromy.	Nicholas M. Katz	2001-11-01	237	978-0691091518
151	The Geometry and Cohomology of Some Simple Shimura Varieties.	Michael Harris, Richard Taylor	2001-01-01	291	978-0691090924
154	Semiclassical Soliton Ensembles for the Focusing Nonlinear Schrodinger Equation	Spyridon Kamvissis, Kenneth D. T-R McLaughlin, Peter D. Miller	2003-09-07	312	9780691114828
155	Markov Processes from K. Ito's Perspective	Daniel W. Stroock	2003-05-26	288	978-0691115436
156	Radon Transforms and the Rigidity of the Grassmannians	Jacques Gasqui, Hubert Goldschmidt	2004-01-25	384	978-0691118994
157	On the Tangent Space to the Space of Algebraic Cycles on a Smooth Algebraic Variety.	Mark Green, Phillip Griffiths	2005-01-09	208	9780691120447
158	Green's Function Estimates for Lattice Schrodinger Operators and Applications.	Jean Bourgain	2004-11-21	200	9780691120980
159	Moments, Monodromy, and Perversity: A Diophantine Perspective	Nicholas M. Katz	2005-10-02	488	978-0691123301
160	Dynamics in One Complex Variable: Third Edition	John Milnor	2006-01-22	320	978-0691124889
161	Modular Forms and Special Cycles on Shimura Curves.	Stephen S. Kudla, Michael Rapoport, Tonghai Yang	2006-24-04	392	9780691125510
162	Integration of One-forms on P-adic Analytic Spaces.	Vladimir G. Berkovich	2006-12-03	168	978-0691128627
163	Mathematical Aspects of Nonlinear Dispersive Equations	Edited by Jean Bourgain, Carlos E. Kenig, S. Klainerman	2007-04-29	296	9780691129556
164	Discrete Orthogonal Polynomials: Asymptotics and Applications	J. Baik, T. Kriecherbauer, K. T.-R. McLaughlin, P. D. Miller	2007-01-22	184	978-0691127347
165	Spherical CR Geometry and Dehn Surgery	Richard Evan Schwartz	2007-02-18	200	9780691128108
166	Lectures on Resolution of Singularities	János Kollár	2007-02-25	208	9780691129235
167	The Hypoelliptic Laplacian and Ray-Singer Metrics	Jean-Michel Bismut, Gilles Lebeau	2008-09-07	376	9780691137322
168	The Structure of Affine Buildings.	Richard M. Weiss	2008-09-08	384	9780691138817
169	Classifying Spaces of Degenerating Polarized Hodge Structures	Kazuya Kato, Sampei Usui	2008-12-07	352	9780691138220
170	Higher Topos Theory	Jacob Lurie	2009-07-26	944	9780691140490
171	Outer Billiards on Kites	Richard Evan Schwartz	2009-10-25	320	9780691142494
172	The Ergodic Theory of Lattice Subgroups	Alexander Gorodnik, Amos Nevo	2009-10-11	160	9780691141855
173	On the Cohomology of Certain Non-Compact Shimura Varieties	Sophie Morel	2010-01-24	232	9780691142937
174	Introduction to Ramsey Spaces	Stevo Todorcevic	2010-07-21	296	9780691145426
175	Weyl Group Multiple Dirichlet Series: Type A Combinatorial Theory	Ben Brubaker, Daniel Bump, Solomon Friedberg	2011-07-25	184	9780691150666
176	Computational Aspects of Modular Forms and Galois Representations: How One Can Compute in Polynomial Time the Value of Ramanujan's Tau at a Prime	Edited by Bas Edixhoven, Jean-Marc Couveignes, Robin de Jong, Franz Merkl, Johan Bosman	2011-06-20	440	9780691142029
177	Hypoelliptic Laplacian and Orbital Integrals	Jean-Michel Bismut	2011-08-28	344	978-0691151304
178	The Ambient Metric	Charles Fefferman, C. Robin Graham	2011-12-04	128	9780691153148
179	Frechet Differentiability of Lipschitz Functions and Porous Sets in Banach Spaces	Joram Lindenstrauss, David Preiss, Jaroslav Tišer	2012-02-26	464	9780691153568
180	Convolution and Equidistribution: Sato-Tate Theorems for Finite-Field Mellin Transforms	Nicholas M. Katz	2012-01-24	208	9780691153315
181	Some Problems of Unlikely Intersections in Arithmetic and Geometry	Umberto Zannier, with Appendixes by David Masser	2012-03-25	176	9780691153711
182	The Decomposition of Global Conformal Invariants	Spyros Alexakis	2012-05-06	464	9780691153483
183	Mumford-Tate Groups and Domains: Their Geometry and Arithmetic	Mark Green, Phillip Griffiths, Matt Kerr	2012-04-22	288	9780691154251
184	The Gross-Zagier Formula on Shimura Curves	Xinyi Yuan, Shou-Wu Zhang, Wei Zhang	2012-12-02	272	978-0691155920
185	Degenerate Diffusion Operators Arising in Population Biology	Charles L. Epstein, Rafe Mazzeo	2013-04-07	320	9780691157153
186	Spaces of PL Manifolds and Categories of Simple Maps	Friedhelm Waldhausen, Bjørn Jahren, John Rognes	2013-04-28	192	9780691157764
187	Chow Rings, Decomposition of the Diagonal, and the Topology of Families	Claire Voisin	2014-02-23	176	978-0691160511
188	Hangzhou Lectures on Eigenfunctions of the Laplacian	Christopher D. Sogge	2014-03-10	208	9780691160788
189	Multi-parameter Singular Integrals, Volume I	Brian Street	2014-10-05	416	9780691162522
190	Descent in Buildings	Bernhard Mühlherr, Holger P. Petersson, Richard M. Weiss	2015-09-22	352	9780691166919
191	Classification of Pseudo-reductive Groups	Brian Conrad, Gopal Prasad	2015-11-10	256	9780691167930
192	Non-Archimedean Tame Topology and Stably Dominated Types	Ehud Hrushovski, François Loeser	2016-02-09	232	9780691161693
193	The p-adic Simpson Correspondence	Ahmed Abbes, Michel Gros, Takeshi Tsuji	2016-02-09	616	9780691170299
194	Fourier Restriction for Hypersurfaces in Three Dimensions and Newton Polyhedra	Isroil A. Ikromov, Detlef Müller	2016-05-24	272	9780691170558
195	Asymptotic Differential Algebra and Model Theory of Transseries	Matthias Aschenbrenner, Lou van den Dries, Joris van der Hoeven	2017-06-06	880	9780691175430
196	Holder Continuous Euler Flows in Three Dimensions with Compact Support in Time	Philip Isett	2017-02-21	216	9780691174839
197	The Mathematics of Shock Reflection-Diffraction and von Neumann's Conjectures	Gui-Qiang G. Chen, Mikhail Feldman	2018-02-27	832	9780691160559
198	The Plaid Model	Richard Evan Schwartz	2019-02-19	280	9780691181387
199	Weil's Conjecture for Function Fields: Volume I	Dennis Gaitsgory, Jacob Lurie	2019-02-19	320	9780691182148
200	The Norm Residue Theorem in Motivic Cohomology	Christian Haesemeyer, Charles A. Weibel	2019-06-11	320	9780691191041
201	The Master Equation and the Convergence Problem in Mean Field Games	Pierre Cardaliaguet, François Delarue, Jean-Michel Lasry, Pierre-Louis Lions	2019-08-13	224	9780691190716
202	Arithmetic and Geometry: Ten Years in Alpbach	Edited by Gisbert Wüstholz, Clemens Fuchs	2019-10-08	186	9780691193779
203	Eisenstein Cohomology for GLN_{N} and the Special Values of Rankin-Selberg L-Functions	Günter Harder, A. Raghuram	2019-12-03	240	9780691197890
204	Introductory Lectures on Equivariant Cohomology	Loring W. Tu, Alberto Arabia	2020-03-03	200	9780691191751
205	What's Next?: The Mathematical Legacy of William P. Thurston	Edited by Dylan P. Thurston	2020-07-07	440	9780691167770
206	Unifying Classes, and Natural Definability	Rod Downey, Noam Greenberg	2020-06-16	234	9780691199665
207	Berkeley Lectures on p-adic Geometry	Peter Scholze, Jared Weinstein	2020-05-26	264	9780691202082
208	Arnold Diffusion for Smooth Systems of Two and a Half Degrees of Freedom	Vadim Kaloshin, Ke Zhang	2020-11-03	218	9780691202525
209	The Structure of Groups with a Quasiconvex Hierarchy	Daniel T. Wise	2021-05-04	376	9780691170459
210	Global Nonlinear Stability of Schwarzschild Spacetime under Polarized Perturbations	Sergiu Klainerman, Jérémie Szeftel	2020-12-15	858	9780691212425
211	A Course on Surgery Theory	Stanley Chang, Shmuel Weinberger	2021-01-26	442	9780691160498
212	Supersingular p-adic L-functions, Maass-Shimura Operators and Waldspurger Formulas	Daniel J. Kriz	2021-11-09	276	9780691216461
213	The Einstein-Klein-Gordon Coupled System: Global Stability of the Minkowski Solution	Alexandru D. Ionescu, Benoît Pausader	2022-03-15	308	9780691233048
214	The Arithmetic of Polynomial Dynamical Pairs	Charles Favre, Thomas Gauthier	2022-06-14	252	9780691235479
215	Moduli Stacks of Étale (ϕ, Γ)-Modules and the Existence of Crystalline Lifts	Matthew Emerton, Toby Gee	2022-12-13	312	9780691241357
216	What Determines an Algebraic Variety?	János Kollár, Max Lieblich, Martin Olsson, Will Sawin	2023-07-25	240	9780691246819
217	Intermittent Convex Integration for the 3D Euler Equations	Tristan Buckmaster, Nader Masmoudi, Matthew Novack, Vlad Vicol	2023-07-11	256	9780691249544
218	Comparison Principles for General Potential Theories and PDEs	Marco Cirant, F. Reese Harvey, H. Blaine Lawson, Kevin R. Payne	2023-10-03	224	9780691243627
219	Instability and Non-uniqueness for the 2D Euler Equations, after M. Vishik	Dallas Albritton, Elia Brué, Maria Colombo, Camillo De Lellis, Vikram Giri, Maximilian Janisch, Hyunju Kwon	2024-02-13	148	9780691257532
220	Exponential Sums, Hypergeometric Sheaves, and Monodromy Groups	Nicholas M. Katz, Pham Huu Tiep	2025-06-24	594	9780691272252
221	Adelic Line Bundles on Quasi-Projective Varieties	Xinyi Yuan, Shou-Wu Zhang	2026-01-13	280	9780691271736
222	Quasiperiodic Solutions of the Generalized SQG Equation	Javier Gómez-Serrano, Alexandru D. Ionescu, and Jaemin Park	2026-06-02	376	9780691280509
223	Multiplicative Hitchin Fibrations and the Fundamental Lemma	Xiao Griffin Wang	2026-10-20	368	978-0691281254
224	Quasi-Projective and Formal-Analytic Arithmetic Surfaces	Jean-Benoît Bost and François Charles	2026-08-04	264	9780691287881
225	Unipotent Ideals and Harish-Chandra Bimodules	Ivan Loseu, Dmytro Matvieievskyi, and Lucas Mason-Brown	2027-01-12	280	9780691294490
