= Sug Woo Shin =

Korean educator (born 1978)

- Born: 1978 (age 47–48); Seoul, South Korea
- Education: Harvard University
- Awards: Sloan Fellowship (2013): Ho-Am Prize (2025)
- Scientific career
- Fields: Mathematics
- Workplaces: University of California, Berkeley; Massachusetts Institute of Technology; University of Chicago; Institute for Advanced Study
- Thesis: Counting Points on Igusa Varieties (2007)
- Doctoral advisor: Richard Taylor

Korean name
- Hangul: 신석우
- Hanja: 申晳宇
- RR: Sin Seoku
- MR: Sin Sŏgu

Sug Woo Shin (Korean: 신석우; born 1978) is a professor of mathematics at the University of California, Berkeley working in number theory, automorphic forms, and the Langlands program.

== Education ==
From 1994 to 1996 when he was in Seoul Science High School, Shin won two gold medals (including a perfect score in 1995) and one bronze medal while representing South Korea at the International Mathematical Olympiad. He graduated from Seoul National University with a Bachelor of Science degree in mathematics in 2000. He received his PhD in mathematics from Harvard University in 2007 under the supervision of Richard Taylor.

== Career ==
Shin was a member of the Institute for Advanced Study from 2007 to 2008, a Dickson Instructor at the University of Chicago from 2008 to 2010, and again a member at the Institute for Advanced Study from 2010 to 2011. He was an assistant professor of mathematics at the Massachusetts Institute of Technology from 2011 to 2014. In 2014, Shin moved to the Department of Mathematics at the University of California, Berkeley as an associate professor. In 2020, Shin became a full professor of mathematics at the University of California, Berkeley.

Shin is a visiting KIAS scholar at the Korea Institute for Advanced Study and a visiting associate member of the Pohang Mathematics Institute.

== Research ==
In 2011, Michael Harris and Shin resolved the dependencies on improved forms of the Arthur–Selberg trace formula in the conditional proofs of generalizations of the Sato–Tate conjecture by Harris (for products of non-isogenous elliptic curves) and Barnet-Lamb–Geraghty–Harris–Taylor (for arbitrary non-CM holomorphic modular forms of weight greater than or equal to two).

== Awards ==
Shin received a Sloan Fellowship in 2013.

Shin received a Samsung Ho-Am Prize in 2025 for his contributions to the Langlands Program.

He was elected to the 2026 class of Fellows of the American Mathematical Society.

== Selected publications ==
- Scholze, Peter; Shin, Sug Woo (2012). "On the cohomology of compact unitary group Shimura varieties at ramified split places". Journal of the American Mathematical Society. 26 (1): 261–294. arXiv:1110.0232. doi:10.1090/S0894-0347-2012-00752-8. ISSN 0894-0347. S2CID 2084602.
- Shin, Sug Woo (2011). "Galois representations arising from some compact Shimura varieties". Annals of Mathematics. Second Series. 173 (3): 1645–1741. doi:10.4007/annals.2011.173.3.9. ISSN 0003-486X.
- Shin, Sug Woo (2009). "Counting points on Igusa varieties". Duke Mathematical Journal. 146 (3): 509–568. doi:10.1215/00127094-2009-004. ISSN 0012-7094.
- Shin, Sug Woo; Templier, Nicolas (2016). "Sato–Tate theorem for families and low-lying zeros of automorphic L-functions". Inventiones Mathematicae. 203 (1): 1–177. arXiv:1208.1945. Bibcode:2016InMat.203....1S. doi:10.1007/s00222-015-0583-y. ISSN 0020-9910.
