= Frank Calegari =

Australian-American mathematician

Frank Calegari FRS
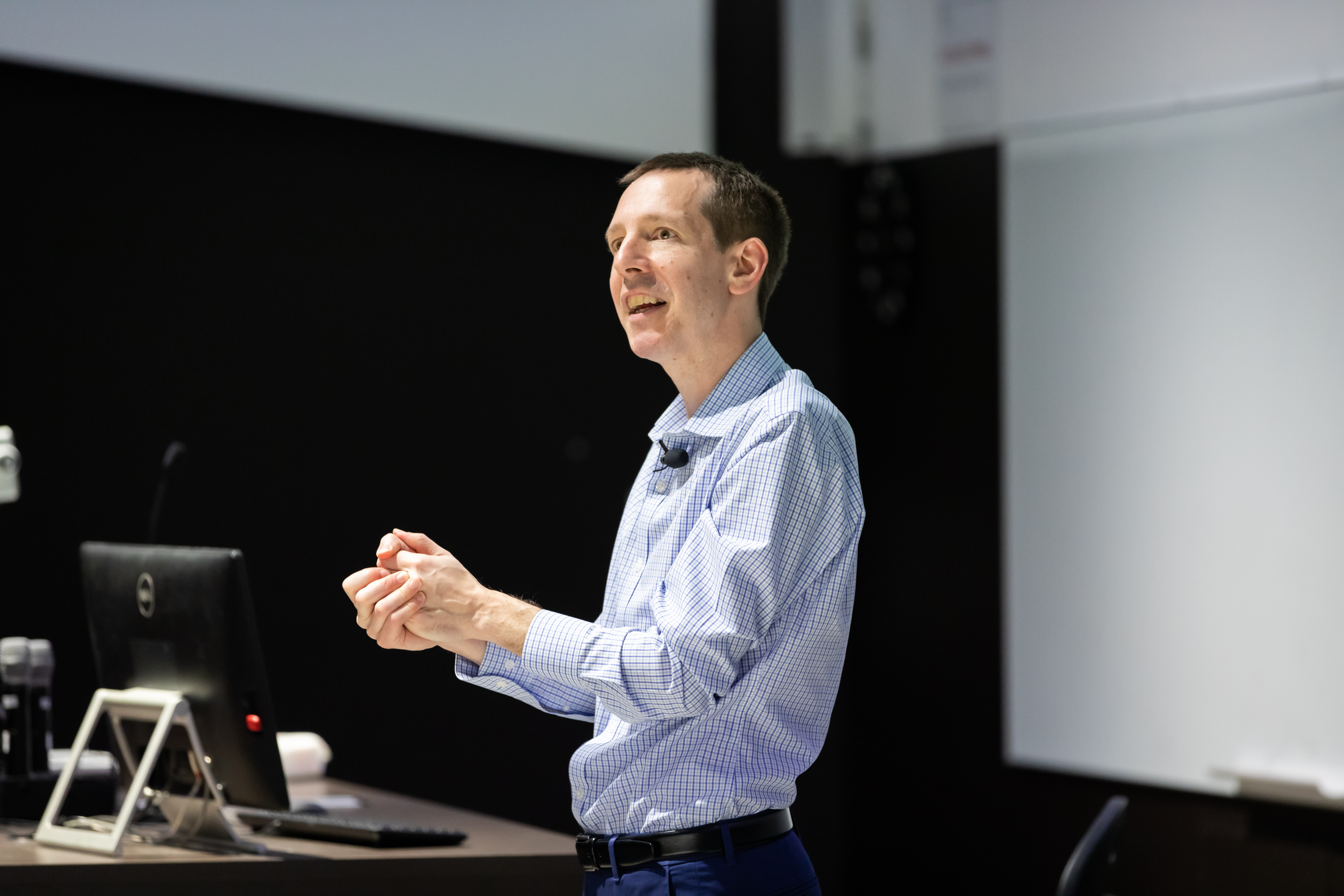
- Calegari giving a public lecture at the Sydney Mathematical Research Institute, 2022
- Born: 15 December 1975 (age 50)
- Citizenship: Australia; United States
- Education: University of California, Berkeley
- Relatives: Danny Calegari (brother)
- Scientific career
- Fields: Mathematics
- Workplaces: University of Chicago; Institute for Advanced Study
- Thesis: Ramification and Semistable Abelian Varieties (2002)
- Doctoral advisor: Ken Ribet

Francesco Damien "Frank" Calegari is a professor of mathematics at the University of Chicago working in number theory and the Langlands program.

== Early life and education ==
Frank Calegari was born on December 15, 1975. He has both Australian and American citizenship.

He won a bronze medal and a silver medal at the International Mathematical Olympiad while representing Australia in 1992 and 1993 respectively. Calegari received his PhD in mathematics from the University of California, Berkeley in 2002 under the supervision of Ken Ribet.

== Career ==
Calegari was a Benjamin Peirce Assistant Professor at Harvard University from 2002 to 2006. He then moved to Northwestern University, where he was an assistant professor from 2006 to 2009, an associate professor from 2009 to 2012, and a professor from 2012 to 2015. He has been a professor of mathematics at the University of Chicago since 2015.

Calegari was a von Neumann Fellow of mathematics at the Institute for Advanced Study from 2010 to 2011.

Calegari was an editor at Mathematische Zeitschrift from 2013 to 2021. He has been an editor of Algebra & Number Theory and an associate editor of the Annals of Mathematics since 2019.

== Research ==
Calegari works in algebraic number theory, including Langlands reciprocity and torsion classes in the cohomology of arithmetic groups.

With George Boxer, Toby Gee, and Vincent Pilloni, he proved that all abelian surfaces and genus two curves over totally real fields are potentially modular and satisfy the Hasse-Weil conjecture.

In collaboration with Vesselin Dimitrov and Yunqing Tang, Calegari proved the unbounded denominators conjecture of A.O.L. Atkin and Swinnerton-Dyer: if a modular form f(τ) is not modular for some congruence subgroup of the modular group, then the Fourier coefficients of f(τ) have unbounded denominators. It has been known for decades that if f(τ) is modular for some congruence subgroup, then its coefficients have bounded denominators.

Also in collaboration with Dimitrov and Tang, he proved the linear independence of 1, ζ(2), and L(2,χ_{−3}). This work, along with their work on the Unbounded Denominators conjecture, adds context to the efforts made to understand Roger Apery's proof of the irrationality of $\zeta(3)$.

== Awards ==
Calegari held a 5-year American Institute of Mathematics Fellowship from 2002 to 2006 and a Sloan Research Fellowship from 2009 to 2012. He was inducted as a Fellow of the American Mathematical Society in 2013, and elected to the American Academy of Arts and Sciences in 2025. He was elected a Fellow of the Royal Society in 2026.

Calegari was a plenary speaker at the 2022 International Congress of Mathematicians, where he gave a lecture entitled "30 years of modularity since Fermat's Last Theorem."

Calegari was awarded the 2026 Cole Prize in Number Theory jointly with Vesselin Dimitrov and Yunqing Tang.

== Selected publications ==
- Calegari, Frank (2011). "Even Galois representations and the Fontaine–Mazur conjecture". Inventiones Mathematicae. 185 (1): 1–16. arXiv:0907.3427. Bibcode:2011InMat.185....1C. doi:10.1007/s00222-010-0297-0. ISSN 0020-9910. S2CID 8937648.
- Calegari, Frank; Emerton, Matthew (2005). "On the ramification of Hecke algebras at Eisenstein primes". Inventiones Mathematicae. 160 (1): 97–144. arXiv:math/0311368. Bibcode:2005InMat.160...97C. doi:10.1007/s00222-004-0406-z. ISSN 0020-9910. S2CID 14827842.
- Calegari, Frank; Emerton, Matthew (2009). "Bounds for multiplicities of unitary representations of cohomological type in spaces of cusp forms". Annals of Mathematics. Second Series. 170 (3): 1437–1446. arXiv:0704.0662. doi:10.4007/annals.2009.170.1437. ISSN 0003-486X.
- Calegari, Frank; Geraghty, David (2018). "Modularity lifting beyond the Taylor–Wiles method". Inventiones Mathematicae. 211 (1): 297–433. arXiv:1207.4224. Bibcode:2018InMat.211..297C. doi:10.1007/s00222-017-0749-x. ISSN 0020-9910. S2CID 16364057.
- Calegari, Frank; Geraghty, David (2020). "Minimal modularity lifting for nonregular symplectic representations". Duke Mathematical Journal. 169 (5): 801–896. arXiv:1907.08691. doi:10.1215/00127094-2019-0044. ISSN 0012-7094. S2CID 85504517.

== Personal life ==
Mathematician Danny Calegari is Frank Calegari's brother.
