= Journal of Functional Analysis =

- Discipline: functional analysis
- Language: English
- Edited by: Guido De Philippis, Alexandru D. Ionescu, Stefaan Vaes

Publication details
- History: 1967–present
- Publisher: Elsevier
- Frequency: Semi-monthly

Standard abbreviations
- ISO 4: J. Funct. Anal.

Indexing
- ISSN: 0022-1236 (print); 1096-0783 (web)
- OCLC no.: 909719210

Links
- Journal homepage

The Journal of Functional Analysis is a mathematics journal published by Elsevier. Founded by Paul Malliavin, Ralph S. Phillips, and Irving Segal, its editors-in-chief are, as of April 2024, Guido De Philippis, Alexandru D. Ionescu and Stefaan Vaes.

It is covered in databases including Scopus, the Science Citation Index, and the SCImago Journal Rank service.
