= UBASIC =

BASIC interpreter program

- UBASIC 32-bit (English Version)
- Original author: Yuji Kida
- Release: before 2005
- Operating system: MS-DOS, Windows
- Type: BASIC
- License: Freeware

UBASIC is a freeware BASIC interpreter for MS-DOS and Windows written by Yuji Kida at Rikkyo University in Japan. It is specialized for number theory, primality testing, factoring, and integers up to 2600 digits. The help files have articles and lessons for beginners.

== Features ==
UBASIC has a built-in on-line editor with several aids for debugging. It can show cross references to calling lines, lines containing a variable, and lists of variables/arrays. It can renumber lines, change variable names, and append additional programs. It can trace, single step, and time by milliseconds to help determine the fastest way to do highly repetitive sections. It can redefine function keys, either to provide an easy one-keypress function or to prevent a standard function from being accidentally used when it shouldn't. It can shell to DOS or execute a DOS command. It can convert between single-byte character set and double-byte character set, but to have much use for this, the host computer would likely need an aware operating system. Documents may be added to or modified in UBHELP.HLP.

Primality testing with APRT-CLE (to 884 digits) (it is best to run this under UBASIC version 8.8F or later): 500 digits said to take 5 hours on a PP-200, 150 digits takes about 16 minutes on a 486-100, about 2¼ minutes on a K6@233; 250 digits takes about 13½ minutes on a K6@233. Recent machines can be up to 10 times faster. APRT-CLE is often the algorithm of choice for testing primality of integers within its range.

Factoring with programs such as ECMX is quite fast. It can find factors with the number of digits in the low-20s fairly easily, mid-20s somewhat less easily, and upper-20s with lower chance of success. It has found a 30-digit factor. (Finding factors with the elliptic curve method is always chancy for larger factors. The greater the number of curves that are tested the greater the chances of success, but the number needed (on average, one can sometimes get lucky or unlucky) increases rapidly with the size of factors. It is always best to use the fastest machine available. ECMX uses the accepted standards for limits of when to stop working with one curve and switch to the next. It has preliminary primality testing, finding small factors, and powers.

Being interpreted allows modifying programs and then restarting (using GOTO) in the middle of a run, even multi-day, without losing accumulated data. Stopping is not recommended unless a program has been saving the data safely somewhere, or if users forgot to write any way to save data when quitting (perhaps they did not expect to find any and were trying to prove it). When doing anything that might lose valuable data, or if you need to do something else for a time, then you can FREEZE the current program to a file and later MELT it (as long as the lower memory configuration is the same).

UBASIC has line numbers. It does not use indentation to control structure. It has subroutines and user functions with passed parameters and local variables. Parameters can be passed by value or by name. User functions and subroutines may be passed as parameters. It has limited labels. It has various options for conditional functions. Users can indent as much as needed or not at all, and can have as much structure as wanted or spaghetti code. It is a mistake to consider UBASIC as "not modern" (as might be inferred by a reader of articles that confuse indentation with structure and don't favor line numbers). Having line numbers allows easy jumping to an intermediate point in a routine, which can sometimes save duplicating lines.

UBASIC version 8 has the high-precision real and complex arithmetic (up to 2600 digits) of prior versions, and adds exact rational arithmetic and arithmetic of single-variable polynomials with complex, rational, or modulo p coefficients, as well as string handling and limited list handling abilities. In also has context-sensitive on-line documentation (read UBHELP.DOC for information). The file that this uses is ASCII and can be printed for a paper document.

As of 2005, the help file had many errors. A ten-year project to rewrite/correct was nearly ready for publication probably by late summer 2005. The new help file has a new extension .hlp, and eventually package name u3d748f*. A list of updates is available, but many changes remain unreported.

Version 8.8 has different precision than 8.74.

There is a new command from version 8.8C POLYCONV that converts polynomials between modulus=0 and modulus=prime. There are no formatting specifications.

WARNING: Never test out any of these when while anything important is (or might be) running or suspended somewhere else, as lockups may be expected, particularly for KEYSCAN. See: FREEZE, ROLL, MELT. (for similar warning)

UBASIC has several types of arrays, logical operators, bit operators, four standard loop structures, and combined operators. It can call machine language routines for increased speed (ECMX does this), but you must know assembly language to even understand the instructions - just being able to write TSR's in DEBUG is not enough.

- String values can be computed if it represents a math formula.
- Strings can usually be executed if it represents a UBASIC command.
- Variables holding strings may usually be substituted for the strings.
- Strings can be alphabetized using MIN or MAX.

UBASIC can be used to process almost any kind of data. For example: .WAV files. It can process text files to convert tabs to spaces or spaces to tabs. Some programs can not generate tabs and some actually choke on them.

Variable types include:

1. integer
2. rational
3. real
4. complex number
5. string
6. packet (mixed from any types including other packets)
7. polynomial
8. mod polynomial (coefficients integers modulo a prime)

An early 2005 Internet search turned up versions 8.74(32), 8.74(16), 8.71(4000(16)), 9.0ZE, 9.0ZC, 9.0E, 8.8F(32), 8.8F(16), 8.8F(C), 8.7E(32), 8.7E(16), 8.30(32), 8.30(16), 7.25(32), 7.25(16), 8.8A(32), 8,8A(16), 8.8A(C), 8.8C(32), 8.8C(16), 8.8C(C), 8.8E(32), 8.8E(16), 8.8E(C). 12 versions out of 52 known numbers. Many of these are not directly identified. (The (16) and (32) refer to the number of bits in the multiplication engine. (4000) refers to special versions that can go up to over 4000 digits (some users may need one of these, such as to generate the first 792 Bernoulli numbers to double index 1584: the latest version can only get 540/1080). The (C) is for CGA machines.)

If you are already using a version later than 8.74 and especially if you are using a version later than 8.7E then you are strongly advised to switch to the latest version (8.8F). Some programs (fancy display, for example) written for 8.74 may not work in 8.8F without considerable rewriting. The latest versions do not strip carriage returns/line feeds from ASCII files, and programs such as UBH (even the one in 8.8F) need added lines to strip them. Any program written for one version should not be used in another version without checking.

Certain programs such as NFS will only run on experimental version 9.**.

The ppmpx36e version of the multi-polynomial quadratic sieve needs 8.8F and Windows.

Some versions of UBASIC came with a defective UBCONST7.DAT file. You should check yours against the one supplied in 8.8F. If it is not identical then you should switch.

== Sample program ==
The following is a short simple program for the partition count function. Although it does not have many of the fancier structures, it is a real program, not invented for this article. On a modern fast Athlon it should calculate the partition counts from p(0) to p(1000) in about ½ second. Contrast that to over ½ century the first time through. To save the result to a file, uncomment line 40 (remove leading apostrophe).

 10   CONSOLE:CONSOLE 1,24,0:LOCATE 1,0
 20   PRINT CHR(2);"N","P(N)","PARTITION COUNT"
 30   WORD -19:POINT -8:H%=11:'FOR N UP TO ~1200
 40   'PRINT=PRINT+"PARTN5.TXT":'output redirect
 50   N=0:'INPUT N
 60   CLR TIME
 70   Mu=PI(SQRT(24*N-1)/6)
 80   CLR S
 90   FOR K=1 TO H%
100    '110 to 160 is selberg formula
110    CLR C
120    FOR L=0 TO 2*K-1
130      IF ((3*L^2+L)\2)@K=(-N)@K
140       :C+=(-1)^L*COS(PI((6*L+1)/(6*K)))
150    NEXT
160    'to get A(K,N), multiply C by SQRT(K/3)
170    U=EXP(Mu/K)
180    R=(Mu+K)/U:'Rademacher's convergence term
190    S+=((Mu-K)*U+R)*C
200   NEXT
210   S=ROUND(ABS(S*2/(MU*(24*N-1))))
220   PRINT CUTSPC(STR(N));
230   LOCATE 38-ALEN(S):PRINT S
240   IF N<1000:INC N:GOTO 70
250   Tt=TIME1000:PRINT=PRINT:PRINT Tt/1000
260   '~1.7% faster if N,K,L changed to N%,K%,L%

== Accuracy ==
When working with continued fractions, the number of terms is limited by the available accuracy and by the size of each term. An approximate formula is 2 decimal fraction digit accuracy for each (term times the base ten logarithm of the term). The only way to do such work safely is to do it twice, in parallel, with the initial input to one dithered in the final several digits (at least 1 word). Then when the two calculations do not give identical terms, stop at the previous term.

UBASIC can calculate the partition function to over p(1330521). (In 8.74 up to p(1361911) and the 4000 digit versions should get many more.)

== See also ==
- Lenstra elliptic curve factorization
- complex numbers
- Prime number
- Jørgen Pedersen Gram
- Logarithmic integral function
- Prime gaps
- Integrated development environment
