= Cole Prize =

Prize awarded by the American Mathematical Society

The Frank Nelson Cole Prize, or Cole Prize for short, is one of two prizes awarded to mathematicians by the American Mathematical Society, one for an outstanding contribution to algebra, and the other for an outstanding contribution to number theory. The prize is named after Frank Nelson Cole, who served the Society for 25 years. The Cole Prize in algebra was funded by Cole himself, from funds given to him as a retirement gift; the prize fund was later augmented by his son, leading to the double award.

The prizes recognize a notable research work in algebra (given every three years) or number theory (given every three years) that has appeared in the last six years. The work must be published in a recognized, peer-reviewed venue. The first award for algebra was made in 1928 to L. E. Dickson, while the first award for number theory was made in 1931 to H. S. Vandiver.

== Frank Nelson Cole Prize in Algebra ==
Year	Prizewinner	Citation
1928	Leonard E. Dickson	for his book "Algebren und ihre Zahlentheorie".
1939	Abraham Adrian Albert	for his papers on the construction of Riemann matrices.
1944	Oscar Zariski	for four papers on algebraic varieties.
1949	Richard Brauer	for his paper "On Artin's L-series with general group characters".
1954	Harish-Chandra	for his papers on representations of semisimple Lie algebras and groups.
1960	Serge Lang	for his paper "Unramified class field theory over function fields in several variables".
1960	Maxwell A. Rosenlicht	for his papers "Generalized Jacobian varieties" and "A universal mapping property of generalized Jacobian varieties".
1965	Walter Feit; John G. Thompson	for their joint paper "Solvability of groups of odd order".
1970	John R. Stallings	for his paper "On torsion-free groups with infinitely many ends".
1970	Richard G. Swan	for his paper "Groups of cohomological dimension one".
1975	Hyman Bass	for his paper "Unitary algebraic K-theory".
1975	Daniel G. Quillen	for his paper "Higher algebraic K-theories".
1980	Michael Aschbacher	for his paper "A characterization of Chevalley groups over fields of odd order".
1980	Melvin Hochster	for his paper "Topics in the homological theory of commutative rings".
1985	George Lusztig	for his fundamental work on the representation theory of finite groups of Lie type.
1990	Shigefumi Mori	for his outstanding work on the classification of algebraic varieties.
1995	Michel Raynaud; David Harbater	for their solution of Abhyankar's conjecture.
2000	Andrei Suslin	for his work on motivic cohomology.
2000	Aise Johan de Jong	for his important work on the resolution of singularities by generically finite maps.
2003	Hiraku Nakajima	for his work in representation theory and geometry.
2006	János Kollár	for his outstanding achievements in the theory of rationally connected varieties and for his illuminating work on a conjecture of Nash.
2009	Christopher Hacon; James McKernan	for their groundbreaking joint work on higher-dimensional birational algebraic geometry.
2012	Alexander Merkurjev	for his work on the essential dimension of groups.
2015	Peter Scholze	for his work on perfectoid spaces which has led to a solution of an important special case of the weight-monodromy conjecture of Deligne.
2018	Robert Guralnick	for his groundbreaking research on representation theory, cohomology, and subgroup structure of finite quasi-simple groups, and the wide-ranging applications of this work to other areas of mathematics.
2021	Chenyang Xu	for leading a group developing an algebraic theory of moduli for K-stable Fano varieties and working out a radically new approach to the singularities of the minimal model program using K-stability.
2024	Jessica Fintzen	for her work transforming the understanding of representations of p-adic groups, in particular for the article “Types for tame p-adic groups”.
2027	Britta Späth	for her pivotal contributions to the proof of the McKay conjecture culminating in the papers "Extensions of characters in type D and the inductive McKay condition, II" and "The McKay Conjecture on character degrees" (the latter joint with Marc Cabanes), which complete the proof.

== Frank Nelson Cole Prize in Number Theory ==
Year	Prizewinner	Citation
1931	Harry Vandiver	for his several papers on Fermat's Last Theorem.
1941	Claude Chevalley	for his paper "La théorie du corps de classes".
1946	Henry B. Mann	for his paper "A proof of the fundamental theorem on the density of sums of sets of positive integers".
1951	Paul Erdős	for his many papers in the theory of numbers.
1956	John T. Tate	for his paper "The higher dimensional cohomology groups of class field theory".
1962	Kenkichi Iwasawa	for his paper "On Γ-extensions of algebraic number fields".
1962	Bernard M. Dwork	for his paper "On the rationality of the zeta function of an algebraic variety".
1967	James Ax; Simon B. Kochen	for a series of three joint papers "Diophantine problems over local fields I, II, III".
1972	Wolfgang M. Schmidt	for various papers.
1977	Goro Shimura	for various papers.
1982	Robert P. Langlands	for pioneering work on automorphic forms, Eisenstein series and product formulas.
1982	Barry Mazur	for outstanding work on elliptic curves and abelian varieties, especially on rational points of finite order.
1987	Dorian M. Goldfeld	for his paper "Gauss's class number problem for imaginary quadratic fields".
1987	Benedict Gross; Don Zagier	for their paper "Heegner points and derivatives of L-series".
1992	Karl Rubin	for his work in the area of elliptic curves and Iwasawa theory.
1992	Paul Vojta	for his work on Diophantine problems.
1997	Andrew J. Wiles	for his work on the Taniyama-Shimura conjecture and Fermat's Last Theorem.
2002	Henryk Iwaniec	for his fundamental contributions to analytic number theory.
2002	Richard Taylor	for several outstanding advances in algebraic number theory.
2005	Peter Sarnak	for his fundamental contributions to number theory.
2008	Manjul Bhargava	for his revolutionary work on higher composition laws.
2011	Chandrashekhar Khare; Jean-Pierre Wintenberger	for their remarkable proof of Serre's modularity conjecture.
2014	Yitang Zhang	for his work on bounded gaps between primes.
2014	Daniel Goldston; János Pintz; Cem Y. Yıldırım	for their work on small gaps between primes.
2017	Henri Darmon	for his contributions to the arithmetic of elliptic curves and modular forms.
2020	James Maynard	for his papers "Small gaps between primes", "Large gaps between primes", and "Primes with restricted digits".
2023	Kaisa Matomäki; Maksym Radziwiłł	for their breakthrough paper "Multiplicative functions in short intervals".
2023	James Newton; Jack Thorne	for their astonishing proof of a landmark, sought-after case of the Langlands conjectures, namely the symmetric power functoriality for holomorphic modular forms, achieved in their two papers "Symmetric power functoriality for holomorphic modular forms I, II".
2026	Frank Calegari; Vesselin Dimitrov; Yunqing Tang	for their article “The unbounded denominators conjecture”.

For full citations, see external links.

== See also ==
- List of mathematics awards
