= Vesselin Dimitrov =

Bulgarian mathematician (born 1986)

Vesselin Atanasov Dimitrov
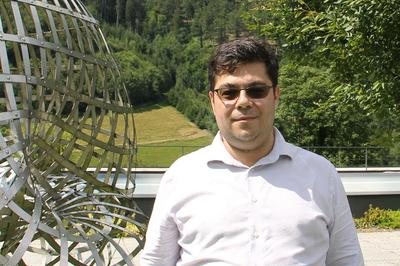
- Dimitrov at Oberwolfach in 2024
- Born: Bulgaria
- Education: Yale University (PhD)
- Awards: David Goss Prize (2022); Oberwolfach Prize (2022); Salem Prize (2025); Fermat Prize (2025); Cole Prize (2026); New Horizons in Mathematics Prize (2026)
- Scientific career
- Fields: Mathematics
- Workplaces: Caltech
- Thesis: Diophantine approximations by special points and applications to dynamics and geometry (2017)
- Doctoral advisor: Alexander Goncharov

Vesselin Atanasov Dimitrov (in Bulgarian: Веселин Атанасов Димитров) is a Bulgarian mathematician known for his work in arithmetic geometry, Diophantine geometry, modular forms and number theory. He is currently a professor at Caltech, having previously taught at the University of Toronto.

Dimitrov received the Oberwolfach Prize and the David Goss Prize in 2022. In 2025, he received the Salem Prize and the Fermat Prize, and in 2026, the Cole Prize in Number Theory. He was invited speaker on the International Congress of Mathematicians, Philadelphia, 2026.

== Research in mathematics ==
In 2019 Dimitrov proved the Schinzel–Zassenhaus conjecture on algebraic units that are not roots of unity.

Together with Ziyang Gao and Philipp Habegger, he proved a uniform version of the Mordell conjecture.

In collaboration with Frank Calegari and Yunqing Tang, Dimitrov proved the unbounded denominators conjecture of Atkin and Swinnerton-Dyer: if a modular form $f(\tau)$ is not modular for some congruence subgroup of the modular group, then the Fourier coefficients of $f(\tau)$ have unbounded denominators.

== Early life and education ==
In 2005, he won a silver medal in the International Mathematics Olympiad, representing Bulgaria.

He earned a PhD from Yale University in 2017 under the supervision of Alexander Goncharov. His thesis is titled "Diophantine approximations by special points and applications to Dynamics and Geometry".

== Awards ==
Dimitrov's work has been recognized by the following awards:

- 2022: David Goss Prize (shared with Ziyang Gao); Oberwolfach Prize
- 2023: IMI Mathematics Prize (Institute of Mathematics and Informatics, Bulgarian Academy of Sciences)
- 2025: Salem Prize, "for fundamental contributions to Diophantine geometry and number theory"; Fermat Prize.
- 2026: New Horizons in Mathematics Prize (shared with Yunqing Tang); Cole Prize in Number Theory (shared with Frank Calegari and Yunqing Tang), for their paper "The unbounded denominators conjecture".
