= Laurent Clozel =

French mathematician (born 1953)

- Born: 23 October 1953 (age 73); Gap, France
- Education: École normale supérieure
- Awards: Prix Élie Cartan
- Scientific career
- Fields: Mathematics
- Workplaces: Paris-Saclay University
- Doctoral advisor: Michel Duflo; Paul Gérardin

Laurent Clozel (born 23 October 1953 in Gap, France) is a French mathematician and professor at Paris-Saclay University. His mathematical work is in the area of automorphic forms, including the Langlands program.

== Career and distinctions ==
Clozel was a student at the École normale supérieure and later obtained a Ph.D. under Michel Duflo and Paul Gérardin.

He received the Prix Élie Cartan of the French Academy for his work on base change for automorphic forms. He was an invited speaker at the 1986 International congress of mathematicians in Berkeley, talking about "Base change for GL(n)".

Together with Richard Taylor, Nicholas Shepherd-Barron, and Michael Harris he proved the Sato–Tate conjecture.

== Selected publications ==
- Arthur, James; Clozel, Laurent (1989). Simple algebras, base change, and the advanced theory of the trace formula. Princeton, N.J: Princeton University Press. ISBN 978-0-691-08518-0. OCLC 18325674.
- Motifs et formes automorphes: applications du principe de fonctorialité In: Clozel, Laurent (1990). Automorphic forms, Shimura varieties, and L-functions : proceedings of a conference held at the University of Michigan, Ann Arbor, July 6-16, 1988. Boston: Academic Press. ISBN 978-0-12-176652-8. OCLC 20637660.
- Bergeron, Nicolas; Clozel, Laurent (2005). Spectre automorphe des variétés hyperboliques et applications topologiques (in French). Paris: Société mathématique de France. ISBN 978-2-85629-186-3. OCLC 70784273.
- The Sato–Tate Conjecture, in Barry Mazur, Wilfried Schmid, Shing-Tung Yau (ed.): Current Developments in Mathematics, American Mathematical Society, 2000
- Laurent Clozel and Luc Illusie, « Nécrologie : André Weil (1906–1998) », Gazette des mathématiciens, vol. 78, 1998, p. 88–91
