= Elena Mantovan =

Mathematician

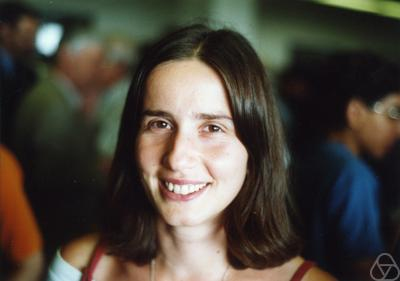
- Education: Harvard University; University of Padua
- Scientific career
- Fields: Arithmetic geometry
- Workplaces: Caltech
- Thesis: On Certain Unitary Group Shimura Varieties (2002)
- Doctoral advisor: Richard Taylor

Elena Mantovan is a mathematician specializing in arithmetic geometry. Educated in Italy and the US, she works in the US as Taussky-Todd–Lonergan Professor of Mathematics at the California Institute of Technology (Caltech).

== Education and career ==
Mantovan earned a laurea in mathematics at the University of Padua in 1995. She completed her Ph.D. in 2002 at Harvard University. Her dissertation, On Certain Unitary Group Shimura Varieties, was supervised by Richard Taylor. She later published it as part of the monograph Variétés de Shimura, espaces de Rapoport-Zink et correspondances de Langlands locales, co-authored with Laurent Fargues (Astérisque 291, Société mathématique de France, 2004).

She was a Miller Research Fellow at the University of California, Berkeley, with Ken Ribet as a mentor, from 2002 until 2005. In 2005, she joined the Caltech faculty. From August 2010 through March 2011, she was a von Neumann Fellow at the Institute for Advanced Study. She was promoted to full professor at Caltech in 2010, and was the executive officer of the mathematics department from 2016 to 2019.

== Mentorship ==
Mantovan is faculty advisor for the Caltech chapter of the Association for Women in Mathematics. She has been cited as a mentor for undergraduate mathematicians including Ila Varma, 2009 honorable mention for the Alice T. Schafer Prize, and Laura Lewis, 2021 winner of the National Center for Women and Information Technology (NCWIT) 2021 Collegiate Award.
