= Overconvergent modular form =

In mathematics, overconvergent modular forms are special p-adic modular forms that are elements of certain p-adic Banach spaces (usually infinite dimensional) containing classical spaces of modular forms as subspaces. They were introduced by Nicholas M. Katz in 1972.
