= Chandrashekhar Khare =

Indian mathematician (born 1968)

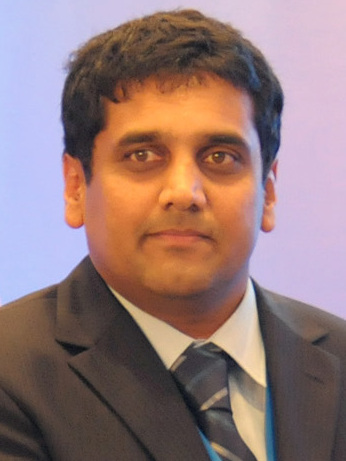
- Chandrashekhar Khare in 2011
- Born: 1968 (age 57–58)
- Education: Caltech; Cambridge University
- Known for: Proof of Serre conjecture
- Awards: INSA Young Scientist Award (1999); Fermat Prize (2007); Infosys Prize (2010); Cole Prize (2011)
- Scientific career
- Fields: Mathematics
- Workplaces: UCLA
- Doctoral advisor: Haruzo Hida; Dinakar Ramakrishnan

Chandrashekhar B. Khare, FRS (born 1968) is a professor of mathematics at the University of California Los Angeles. In 2005, he made a major advance in the field of Galois representations and number theory by proving the level 1 Serre conjecture, and later a proof of the full conjecture with Jean-Pierre Wintenberger. He has been on the Mathematical Sciences jury for the Infosys Prize from 2015, serving as Jury Chair from 2020.

== Professional career ==
Resident of Mumbai, India and completed his undergraduate education at Trinity College, Cambridge. He finished his thesis in 1995 under the supervision of Haruzo Hida at California Institute of Technology. His Ph.D. thesis was published in the Duke Mathematical Journal. He proved Serre's modularity conjecture with Jean-Pierre Wintenberger, published in Inventiones Mathematicae.

He started his career as a Fellow at Tata Institute of Fundamental Research. He was appointed as an associate professor of mathematics at the University of Utah until he moved to UCLA in 2007. As of the year 2025, he is Professor and Chair of the UCLA Department of Mathematics.

== Awards and honors ==
Khare is the winner of the INSA Young Scientist Award (1999), Fermat Prize (2007), the Infosys Prize (2010), and the Cole Prize (2011).

He gave an invited talk at the International Congress of Mathematicians in 2010, on the topic of "Number Theory".

In 2012 he became a fellow of the American Mathematical Society and was elected as a Fellow of the Royal Society.
