= Katz–Lang finiteness theorem =

On kernels of maps between abelianized fundamental groups of schemes and fields

In number theory, the Katz–Lang finiteness theorem, proved by Nick Katz and Serge Lang (1981), states that if X is a smooth, geometrically connected scheme of finite type over a field K that is finitely generated over the prime field, and Ker(X/K) is the kernel of the maps between their abelianized fundamental groups, then Ker(X/K) is finite if K has characteristic 0, and the part of the kernel coprime to p is finite if K has characteristic p > 0.
