= Duflo isomorphism =

In mathematics, the Duflo isomorphism is an isomorphism between the center of the universal enveloping algebra of a finite-dimensional Lie algebra over a field of characteristic zero and the invariants of its symmetric algebra. It was introduced by Michel Duflo (1977) and later generalized to arbitrary finite-dimensional Lie algebras by Maxim Kontsevich.

The Poincaré-Birkoff-Witt theorem gives for any Lie algebra $\mathfrak{g}$ a vector space isomorphism from the polynomial algebra $S(\mathfrak{g})$ to the universal enveloping algebra $U(\mathfrak{g})$. This map is not an algebra homomorphism. It is equivariant with respect to the natural representation of $\mathfrak{g}$ on these spaces, so it restricts to a vector space isomorphism

$$F\colon S(\mathfrak{g})^{\mathfrak{g}} \to  U(\mathfrak{g})^{\mathfrak{g}}$$

where the superscript indicates the subspace annihilated by the action of $\mathfrak{g}$. Both $S(\mathfrak{g})^{\mathfrak{g}}$ and $U(\mathfrak{g})^{\mathfrak{g}}$ are commutative subalgebras, indeed $U(\mathfrak{g})^{\mathfrak{g}}$ is the center of $U(\mathfrak{g})$, but $F$ is still not an algebra homomorphism. However, Duflo proved that in some cases we can compose $F$ with a map

$$G \colon S(\mathfrak{g})^{\mathfrak{g}} \to  S(\mathfrak{g})^{\mathfrak{g}}$$

to get an algebra isomorphism

$$F \circ G \colon S(\mathfrak{g})^{\mathfrak{g}} \to  U(\mathfrak{g})^{\mathfrak{g}} .$$

Later, using the Kontsevich formality theorem, Kontsevich showed that this works for all finite-dimensional Lie algebras.

Following Calaque and Rossi, the map $G$ can be defined as follows. The adjoint action of $\mathfrak{g}$ is the map

$$\mathfrak{g} \to \mathrm{End}(\mathfrak{g})$$

sending $x \in \mathfrak{g}$ to the operation $[x,-]$ on $\mathfrak{g}$. We can treat map as an element of

$$\mathfrak{g}^\ast \otimes \mathrm{End}(\mathfrak{g})$$

or, for that matter, an element of the larger space $S(\mathfrak{g}^\ast) \otimes \mathrm{End}(\mathfrak{g})$, since $\mathfrak{g}^\ast \subset S(\mathfrak{g}^\ast)$. Call this element

$$\mathrm{ad} \in S(\mathfrak{g}^\ast) \otimes \mathrm{End}(\mathfrak{g})$$

Both $S(\mathfrak{g}^\ast)$ and $\mathrm{End}(\mathfrak{g})$ are algebras so their tensor product is as well. Thus, we can take powers of $\mathrm{ad}$, say

$$\mathrm{ad}^k \in S(\mathfrak{g}^\ast) \otimes \mathrm{End}(\mathfrak{g}).$$

Going further, we can apply any formal power series to $\mathrm{ad}$ and obtain an element of $\overline{S}(\mathfrak{g}^\ast) \otimes \mathrm{End}(\mathfrak{g})$, where $\overline{S}(\mathfrak{g}^\ast)$ denotes the algebra of formal power series on $\mathfrak{g}^\ast$. Working with formal power series and applying the hypothesis that $\mathfrak{g}$ is defined over a field of characteristic zero, we thus obtain an element

$$\sqrt{\frac{e^{\mathrm{ad}/2} - e^{-\mathrm{ad}/2}}{\mathrm{ad}}} \in \overline{S}(\mathfrak{g}^\ast) \otimes \mathrm{End}(\mathfrak{g})$$

Since the dimension of $\mathfrak{g}$ is finite, one can think of $\mathrm{End}(\mathfrak{g})$ as $\mathrm{M}_n(\mathbb{R})$, hence $\overline{S}(\mathfrak{g}^\ast) \otimes \mathrm{End}(\mathfrak{g})$ is $\mathrm{M}_n(\overline{S}(\mathfrak{g}^\ast))$ and by applying the determinant map, we obtain an element

$\tilde{J}^{1/2} := \mathrm{det} \sqrt{\frac{e^{\mathrm{ad}/2} - e^{-\mathrm{ad}/2}}{\mathrm{ad}}} \in \overline{S}(\mathfrak{g}^\ast)$

which is related to the Todd class in algebraic topology.

Now, $\mathfrak{g}^\ast$ acts as derivations on $S(\mathfrak{g})$ since any element of $\mathfrak{g}^\ast$ gives a translation-invariant vector field on $\mathfrak{g}$. As a result, the algebra $S(\mathfrak{g}^\ast)$ acts on as differential operators on $S(\mathfrak{g})$, and this extends to an action of $\overline{S}(\mathfrak{g}^\ast)$ on $S(\mathfrak{g})$. We can thus define a linear map

$$G \colon S(\mathfrak{g}) \to S(\mathfrak{g})$$

by

$$G(\psi) = \tilde{J}^{1/2} \psi$$

and since the whole construction was invariant, $G$ restricts to the desired linear map

$$G \colon S(\mathfrak{g})^{\mathfrak{g}} \to  S(\mathfrak{g})^{\mathfrak{g}} .$$

== Properties ==
For a nilpotent Lie algebra the Duflo isomorphism coincides with the symmetrization map from symmetric algebra to universal enveloping algebra. For a semisimple Lie algebra the Duflo isomorphism is compatible in a natural way with the Harish-Chandra isomorphism.
