= Yu Deng =

Chinese mathematician (born 1989)

- 邓煜
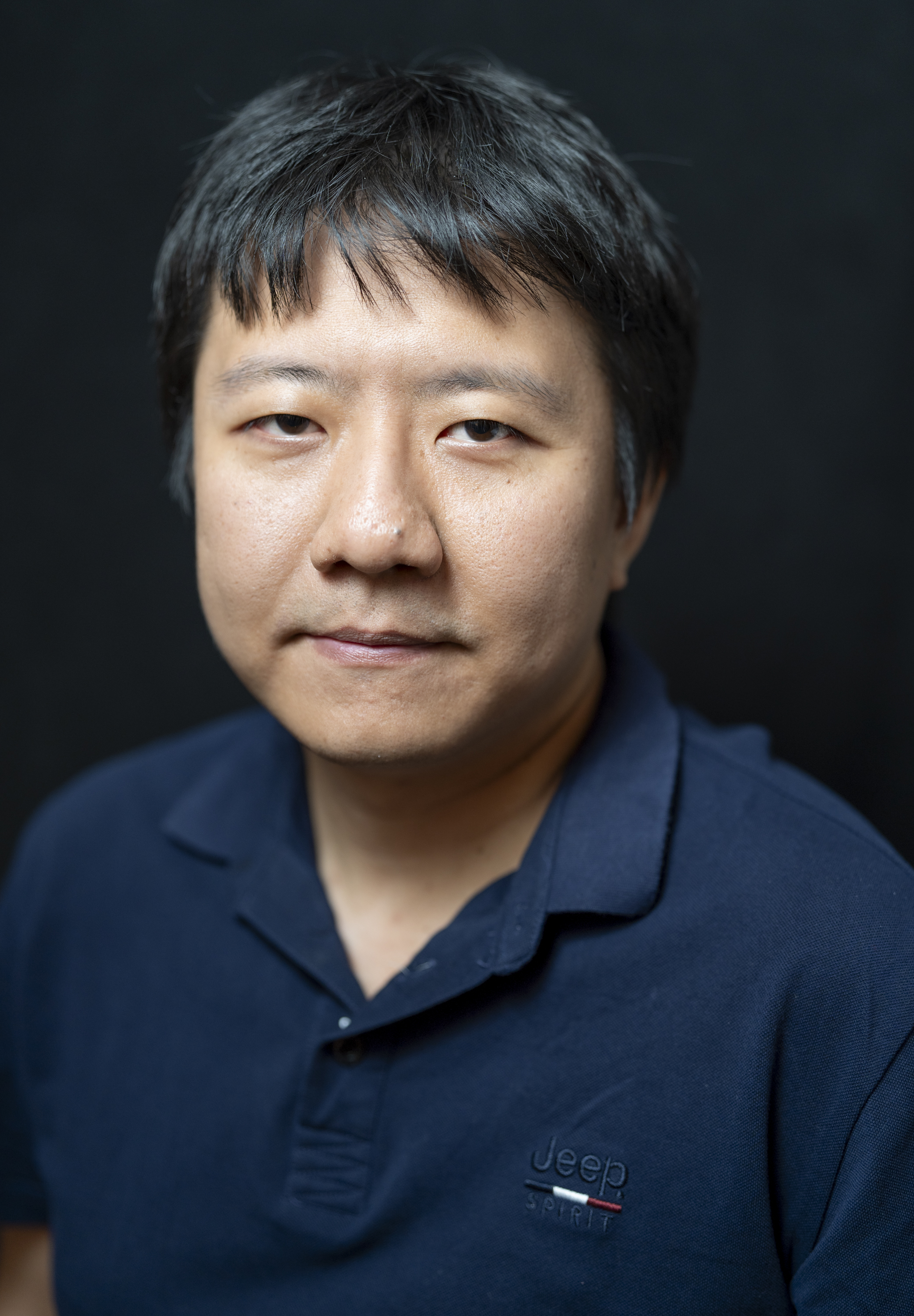
- Deng in 2026
- Born: June 1989 (age 37); Kaifeng, Henan, China
- Education: Peking University (attended); Massachusetts Institute of Technology (BS); Princeton University (PhD)
- Known for: Derivation of the Boltzmann equation
- Awards: Oberwolfach Prize (2025); Clay Research Award (2026); Fields Medal (2026)
- Scientific career
- Fields: Mathematics
- Workplaces: New York University; University of Southern California; University of Chicago
- Thesis: Long time behavior of some nonlinear dispersive equations (2015)
- Doctoral advisor: Alexandru D. Ionescu
- Website: UChicago faculty page Personal website

Yu Deng
- Simplified Chinese: 邓煜
- Traditional Chinese: 鄧煜
Transcriptions
Standard Mandarin
- Hanyu Pinyin: Dèng Yù
- Wade–Giles: Têng⁴ Yü⁴

Yu Deng (Chinese: 邓煜; pinyin: Dèng Yù, born June 1989) is a Chinese mathematician and a professor of mathematics at the University of Chicago. He is known for his contributions to partial differential equations, fluid dynamics, and probabilistic analysis. He was awarded the Fields Medal in 2026 for his derivation of the Boltzmann equation, his derivation of wave kinetic equations from nonlinear dispersive systems, and his development of probabilistic approaches to non-linear dynamics.

== Early life and education ==
Deng was born in June 1989 in Kaifeng, Henan, China. His father was a software engineer, and his mother was a gastroenterologist. He was raised in Shenzhen, Guangdong, and began participating in mathematics competitions in primary school.

As a child, Deng excelled in tournaments of the Chinese strategy board game Go. In 2001, while in middle school, he competed professionally but failed to qualify for the national Go tournament in China. He later recalled, "Either Go or math. Since I lost, I decided to move my focus to math." As a first-year student at Shenzhen Senior High School, he won first prize at the 2006 Chinese Mathematical Olympiad. He then represented China in the 2006 International Mathematical Olympiad, where he won a gold medal at age 16.

Granted exemption from the Gaokao, Deng was admitted to Peking University in 2007, the same year as Hong Wang. He was an undergraduate there for two years until June 2009, when he transferred to the Massachusetts Institute of Technology (MIT), where he graduated with a Bachelor of Science in mathematics in 2011. As an undergraduate at MIT, Deng developed an interest in partial differential equations and, after working on a problem given to him by Gigliola Staffilani, published a paper on the nonlinear Schrödinger equation in the journal Analysis & Partial Differential Equations.

In 2015, Deng earned his Ph.D. in mathematics from Princeton University. As a doctoral student at Princeton, Deng won a Jacobus Fellowship, the university's highest honor for graduate students. His doctoral dissertation, completed under Alexandru D. Ionescu, was titled, "Long time behavior of some nonlinear dispersive equations". Ionescu recalled Deng as "brilliant from the beginning...even as a graduate student, without experience...he was very good at getting at the essence of the thing, picking up what matters in a problem."

== Career ==
After receiving his doctorate, Deng was an instructor at the Courant Institute of Mathematical Sciences at New York University from 2015 to 2018. He became an assistant professor of mathematics at the University of Southern California in 2018 and a full professor there in April 2024. In September 2024, Deng joined the faculty of the University of Chicago as an associate professor of mathematics and was promoted to a full professorship in June 2025.

== Academic research ==
Deng works in partial differential equations and mathematical physics, particularly on probabilistic and combinatorial methods for nonlinear wave and particle systems. With Andrea Nahmod and Haitian Yue, he developed tools known as random tensors to study rough random initial data for the two-dimensional nonlinear Schrödinger equation, proving invariance of the associated Gibbs measure. With Zaher Hani at the University of Michigan, he subsequently used combinatorial expansions of interacting waves to rigorously derive the wave kinetic equation from the Schrödinger equation over the time scales predicted by physics.

Deng and his collaborators adapted these methods to systems of hard spheres. They derived the Boltzmann equation from Newtonian particle dynamics over long time scales, overcoming the repeated-collision problem that had restricted earlier results to very short times. For a periodic-box model, their work combined with earlier Boltzmann-to-Navier–Stokes limits to establish a rigorous passage from microscopic particle motion to macroscopic fluid behaviour in a major case of Hilbert's sixth problem.

== Awards ==
In 2021, Deng received a Sloan Research Fellowship in recognition of outstanding early-career research. In 2025, he was awarded the Oberwolfach Prize for "his outstanding achievements in analysis and applied mathematics". In 2026, he was awarded the Clay Research Award for "remarkable derivation of the Boltzmann equation for long times, starting from a system of hard spheres".

On 23 July 2026, Deng was awarded the Fields Medal alongside Hong Wang, John Pardon, and Jacob Tsimerman at the International Congress of Mathematicians in Philadelphia, Pennsylvania. He and Hong Wang are the first Chinese citizens to be awarded the Fields Medal.

For his work in partial differential equations, including the rigorous derivation of the Boltzmann equation from hard-sphere dynamics for rarefied gases, the derivation of wave kinetic equations from nonlinear dispersive systems, and probabilistic approaches to nonlinear Schrödinger dynamics.

— International Mathematical Union short citation, Fields Medal
