= Sato–Tate conjecture =

Mathematical conjecture about elliptic curves

- Field: Arithmetic geometry
- Conjectured by: Mikio Sato; John Tate
- Conjectured in: c. 1960
- First proof by: Laurent Clozel; Thomas Barnet-Lamb; David Geraghty; Michael Harris; Nicholas Shepherd-Barron; Richard Taylor
- First proof in: 2011

In mathematics, the Sato–Tate conjecture is a statistical statement about the family of elliptic curves E_{p} obtained from an elliptic curve E over the rational numbers by reduction modulo almost all prime numbers p. Mikio Sato and John Tate independently posed the conjecture around 1960.

If N_{p} denotes the number of points on the elliptic curve E_{p} defined over the finite field with p elements, the conjecture gives an answer to the distribution of the second-order term for N_{p}. By Hasse's theorem on elliptic curves,

$$N_p/p = 1 + \mathrm{O}(1/\!\sqrt{p})\$$

as $p\to\infty$, and the point of the conjecture is to predict how the O-term varies.

The original conjecture and its generalization to all totally real fields was proved by Laurent Clozel, Michael Harris, Nicholas Shepherd-Barron, and Richard Taylor under mild assumptions in 2008, and completed by Thomas Barnet-Lamb, David Geraghty, Harris, and Taylor in 2011. Several generalizations to other algebraic varieties and fields are open.

== Statement ==
Let E be an elliptic curve defined over the rational numbers without complex multiplication. For a prime number p, define θ_{p} as the solution to the equation

$$p+1-N_p=2\sqrt{p}\cos\theta_p ~~ (0\leq \theta_p \leq \pi).$$

Then, for every two real numbers $\alpha$ and $\beta$ for which $0\leq \alpha < \beta \leq \pi,$

$$\lim_{N\to\infty}\frac{\#\{p\leq N:\alpha\leq \theta_p \leq \beta\}}
{\#\{p\leq N\}}=\frac{2}{\pi}  \int_\alpha^\beta \sin^2 \theta \, d\theta =  \frac{1}{\pi}\left(\beta-\alpha+\sin(\alpha)\cos(\alpha)-\sin(\beta)\cos(\beta)\right)$$

== Details ==
By Hasse's theorem on elliptic curves, the ratio

$$\frac{(p + 1)-N_p}{2\sqrt{p}}=\frac{a_p}{2\sqrt{p}}$$

is between -1 and 1. Thus it can be expressed as cos θ for an angle θ; in geometric terms there are two eigenvalues accounting for the remainder and with the denominator as given they are complex conjugate and of absolute value 1. The Sato–Tate conjecture, when E doesn't have complex multiplication, states that the probability measure of θ is proportional to

$\sin^2 \theta \, d\theta.$

This is due to Mikio Sato and John Tate (independently, and around 1960, published somewhat later).

== Proof ==
In 2008, Clozel, Harris, Shepherd-Barron, and Taylor published a proof of the Sato–Tate conjecture for elliptic curves over totally real fields satisfying a certain condition: of having multiplicative reduction at some prime, in a series of three joint papers.

Further results are conditional on improved forms of the Arthur–Selberg trace formula. Harris has a conditional proof of a result for the product of two elliptic curves (not isogenous) following from such a hypothetical trace formula. In 2011, Barnet-Lamb, Geraghty, Harris, and Taylor proved a generalized version of the Sato–Tate conjecture for an arbitrary non-CM holomorphic modular form of weight greater than or equal to two, by improving the potential modularity results of previous papers. The prior issues involved with the trace formula were solved by Michael Harris, and Sug Woo Shin.

In 2015, Richard Taylor was awarded the Breakthrough Prize in Mathematics "for numerous breakthrough results in (...) the Sato–Tate conjecture."

== Generalisations ==
There are generalisations, involving the distribution of Frobenius elements in Galois groups involved in the Galois representations on étale cohomology. In particular there is a conjectural theory for curves of genus n > 1.

Under the random matrix model developed by Nick Katz and Peter Sarnak, there is a conjectural correspondence between (unitarized) characteristic polynomials of Frobenius elements and conjugacy classes in the compact Lie group USp(2n) = Sp(n). The Haar measure on USp(2n) then gives the conjectured distribution, and the classical case is USp(2) = SU(2).

== Refinements ==
There are also more refined statements. The Lang–Trotter conjecture (1976) of Serge Lang and Hale Trotter states the asymptotic number of primes p with a given value of a_{p}, the trace of Frobenius that appears in the formula. For the typical case (no complex multiplication, trace ≠ 0) their formula states that the number of p up to X is asymptotically

$$c \sqrt{X}/ \log X\$$

with a specified constant c. Neal Koblitz (1988) provided detailed conjectures for the case of a prime number q of points on E_{p}, motivated by elliptic curve cryptography. In 1999, Chantal David and Francesco Pappalardi proved an averaged version of the Lang–Trotter conjecture.

== See also ==
- Wigner semicircle distribution
