= Chris Hall (cryptographer) =

American cryptographer and mathematician

Christopher Hall is an American cryptographer and mathematician, specializing in arithmetic geometry. He is one of the creators of the cryptosystem Twofish. He obtained a BS from the University of Colorado-Boulder Department of Computer Science and a PhD in Mathematics from Princeton University in 2003, under Nick Katz.

He is an associate professor of mathematics at the University of Western Ontario.
