= Modular forms modulo p =

Mathematical concept

In mathematics, modular forms are particular complex analytic functions on the upper half-plane of interest in complex analysis and number theory. When reduced modulo a prime p, there is an analogous theory to the classical theory of complex modular forms and the p-adic theory of modular forms.

== Reduction of modular forms modulo 2 ==
=== Conditions to reduce modulo 2 ===
Modular forms are analytic functions, so they admit a Fourier series. As modular forms also satisfy a certain kind of functional equation with respect to the group action of the modular group, this Fourier series may be expressed in terms of $q=e^{2 \pi i z}$. So if $f$ is a modular form, then there are coefficients $c(n)$ such that $f(z) = \sum_{n \in \mathbb{N}} c(n)q^n$. To reduce modulo 2, consider the subspace of modular forms with coefficients of the $q$-series being all integers (since complex numbers, in general, may not be reduced modulo 2). It is then possible to reduce all coefficients modulo 2, which will give a modular form modulo 2.

=== Basis for modular forms modulo 2 ===
Modular forms are generated by $G_4$ and $G_6$. It is then possible to normalize $G_4$ and $G_6$ to $E_4$ and $E_6$, having integers coefficients in their $q$-series. This gives generators for modular forms, which may be reduced modulo 2. Note the Miller basis has some interesting properties: once reduced modulo 2, $E_4$ and $E_6$ are just $1$; that is, a trivial reduction. To get a non-trivial reduction, one must use the modular discriminant $\Delta$. Thus, modular forms are seen as polynomials of $E_4$,$E_6$ and $\Delta$ (over the complex $\mathbb{C}$ in general, but seen over integers $\mathbb{Z}$ for reduction), once reduced modulo 2, they become just polynomials of $\Delta$ over $\mathbb{F}_2$.

=== The modular discriminant modulo 2 ===
The modular discriminant is defined by an infinite product, $\Delta(q) = q \prod_{n=1}^\infty (1-q^n)^{24} = \sum_{n=1}^\infty \tau(n)q^n,$ where $\tau(n)$ is the Ramanujan tau function. Results from Kolberg and Jean-Pierre Serre demonstrate that, modulo 2, we have $\Delta(q) \equiv \sum_{m=0}^{\infty} q^{(2m+1)^2} \bmod 2$ i.e., the $q$-series of $\Delta$ modulo 2 consists of $q$ to powers of odd squares.

== Hecke operators modulo 2 ==
The action of the Hecke operators is fundamental to understanding the structure of spaces of modular forms. It is therefore justified to try to reduce them modulo 2.

The Hecke operators for a modular form $f$ are defined as follows: $T_nf(z) = n^{2k-1}\sum_{a \geq 1,\, ad=n,\, 0 \leq b < d} d^{-2k}f \left( \frac{az+b}{d} \right)$ with $n \in \N$.

Hecke operators may be defined on the $q$-series as follows: if $f(z) = \sum_{n \in \Z} c(n)q^n$, then $T_nf(z) = \sum_{m \in \Z} \gamma(m)q^m$ with

$$\gamma(z) = \sum_{a | (n,m),\, a \geq 1} a^{2k-1} c\left( \frac{mn}{a^2} \right).$$

Since modular forms were reduced using the $q$-series, it makes sense to use the $q$-series definition. The sum simplifies a lot for Hecke operators of primes (i.e. when $m$ is prime): there are only two summands. This is very nice for reduction modulo 2, as the formula simplifies a lot. With more than two summands, there would be many cancellations modulo 2, and the legitimacy of the process would be doubtable. Thus, Hecke operators modulo 2 are usually defined only for primes numbers.

With $f$ a modular form modulo 2 with $q$-representation $f(q) = \sum_{n \in \N} c(n)q^n$, the Hecke operator $T_p$ on $f$ is defined by $\overline{T_p}|f(q) = \sum_{n \in \N} \gamma(n)q^n$ where

$$\gamma(n) = \begin{cases}
c(np)        & \text{ if } p \nmid n \\
c(np)+c(n/p) & \text{ if } p \mid  n
\end{cases} \quad \text{ and } p \text{ an odd prime}.$$

Hecke operators modulo 2 have the property of being nilpotent. Finding their order of nilpotency is a problem solved by Jean-Pierre Serre and Jean-Louis Nicolas in a paper published in 2012:.

== The Hecke algebra modulo 2 ==
The Hecke algebra may also be reduced modulo 2. It is defined to be the algebra generated by Hecke operators modulo 2, over $\mathbb{F}_2$.

Following Serre and Nicolas's notations, $\mathcal{F} = \left\langle \Delta^k \mid k \text{ odd} \right\rangle$, i.e. $\mathcal{F} = \left\langle \Delta, \Delta^3, \Delta^5, \Delta^7, \Delta^9, \dots \right\rangle$. Writing $\mathcal{F}(n) = \left\langle \Delta, \Delta^3, \Delta^5, \dots, \Delta^{2n-1} \right\rangle$ so that $\dim(\mathcal{F}(n)) = n$, define $A(n)$ as the $\mathbb{F}_2$-subalgebra of $\text{End}\left(\mathcal{F}(n)\right)$ given by $\mathbb{F}_2$ and $T_p$.

That is, if $\mathfrak{m}(n) = \{T_{p_1} \cdot T_{p_2} \cdots T_{p_k} \mid p_1, p_2, \dots, p_k \in \mathbb{P}, k\geq 1\}$ is a sub-vector-space of $\mathcal{F}$, we get $A(n) = \mathbb{F}_2 \oplus \mathfrak{m}(n)$.

Finally, define the Hecke algebra $A$ as follows: Since $\mathcal{F}(n) \subset \mathcal{F}(n+1)$, one can restrict elements of $A(n+1)$ to $\mathcal{F}$ to obtain an element of $A(n)$. When considering the map $\phi_n: A(n+1) \to A(n)$ as the restriction to $\mathcal{F}(n)$, then $\phi_n$ is a homomorphism. As $A(1)$ is either identity or zero, $A(1) \cong \mathbb{F}_2$. Therefore, the following chain is obtained: $\dots \to A(n+1) \to A(n) \to A(n-1) \to \dots \to A(2) \to A(1) \cong \mathbb{F}_2$. Then, define the Hecke algebra $A$ to be the projective limit of the above $A(n)$ as $n \to \infty$. Explicitly, this means $A = \varprojlim_{n \in \N} A(n) = \left\lbrace T_{p_1} \cdot T_{p_2} \cdots T_{p_k} | p_1, p_2, \dots, p_k \in \mathbb{P}, k\geq 0 \right\rbrace$.

The main property of the Hecke algebra $A$ is that it is generated by series of $T_3$ and $T_5$. That is: $A = \mathbb{F}_2\left[ T_p \mid p \in \mathbb{P} \right] = \mathbb{F}_2 \left[\left[ T_3, T_5 \right]\right]$.

So for any prime $p \in \mathbb{P}$, it is possible to find coefficients $a_{ij}(p) \in \mathbb{F}_2$ such that $T_p = \sum_{i+j \geq 1} a_{ij}(p) T_3^iT_5^j$.
