= Goncharov conjecture =

In mathematics, the Goncharov conjecture is a conjecture introduced by Goncharov suggesting that the cohomology of certain motivic complexes coincides with pieces of K-groups. It extends a conjecture due to Zagier.

== Statement ==
Let $F$ be a field. Goncharov defined the following complex called $\Gamma(F,n)$ placed in degrees $[1,n]$:

$$\Gamma_F(n): \mathcal B_n(F)\to \mathcal B_{n-1}(F)\otimes F^\times_\mathbb Q\to\dots\to \Lambda^n F^\times_\mathbb Q.$$

He conjectured that $i$-th cohomology of this complex is isomorphic to the motivic cohomology group $H^i_{mot}(F,\mathbb Q(n))$.
