= Kevin Buzzard =

British mathematician

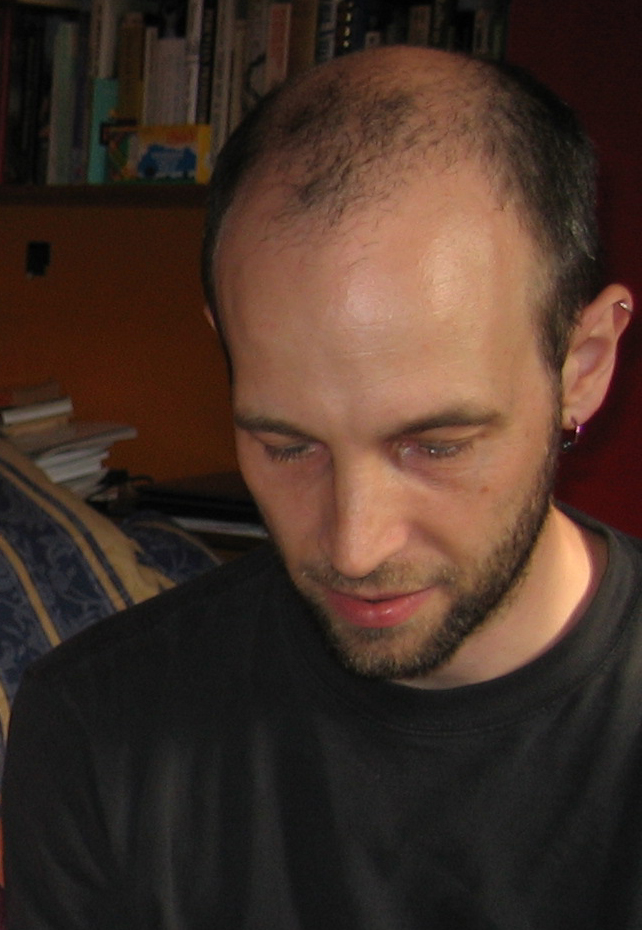
- Buzzard in 2007
- Born: 21 September 1968 (age 57)
- Education: Trinity College, Cambridge
- Awards: Whitehead Prize (2002); Senior Berwick Prize (2008)
- Scientific career
- Fields: Mathematics
- Workplaces: Imperial College London; Harvard University
- Thesis: The Levels of Modular Representations (1995)
- Doctoral advisor: Richard Taylor
- Doctoral students: Daniel Snaith; Toby Gee

Kevin Mark Buzzard (born 21 September 1968) is a British mathematician and currently a professor of pure mathematics at Imperial College London. He specialises in arithmetic geometry and the Langlands program.

== Biography ==
While attending the Royal Grammar School, High Wycombe he competed in the International Mathematical Olympiad, where he won a bronze medal in 1986 and a gold medal with a perfect score in 1987.

He obtained a B.A. degree in Mathematics at Trinity College, Cambridge, where he was Senior Wrangler in 1990, and a C.A.S.M. in 1991. He then received his Ph.D. under the supervision of Richard Taylor with a thesis titled The levels of modular representations in 1995.

He took a lectureship at Imperial College London in 1998, a readership in 2002, and was appointed to a professorship in 2004. From October to December 2002 he held a visiting professorship at Harvard University, having previously worked at the Institute for Advanced Study, Princeton (1995), the University of California Berkeley (1996-7), and the Institute Henri Poincaré in Paris (2000).

He was awarded a Whitehead Prize by the London Mathematical Society in 2002 for "his distinguished work in number theory", and the Senior Berwick Prize in 2008.

In 2017, he launched an ongoing formalization project and blog involving the Lean theorem prover and has since promoted the use of computer proof assistants in future mathematics research. He gave a plenary lecture at the International Congress of Mathematicians in 2022 on the topic.

He was the PhD supervisor to musician Dan Snaith, also known as Caribou, who received a PhD in mathematics from Imperial College London for his work on Overconvergent Siegel Modular Symbols.

In 2024, Buzzard and collaborators were awarded a five-year EPSRC grant to begin formalising Fermat's Last Theorem in Lean.
