= Michel Duflo =

French mathematician (born 1943)

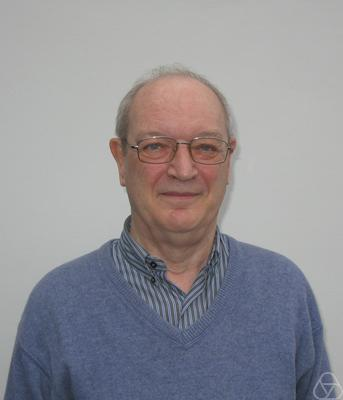
- Duflo in 2012
- Born: 1943 (age 82–83)
- Education: École normale supérieure University of Paris
- Children: Esther Duflo
- Scientific career
- Fields: Mathematics
- Workplaces: Paris Diderot University
- Doctoral students: Laurent Clozel

Michel Duflo (born 1943) is a French mathematician who works in the representation theory of Lie groups.

== Life ==
From 1962, Duflo studied at the École normale supérieure and received a doctorate under the supervision of Jacques Dixmier. Currently, he is an emeritus professor at the University of Paris VII (Denis Diderot) at the Institut de Mathématiques de Jussieu, and at the École normale supérieure.

Duflo has worked on the orbit method of Alexander Kirillov. He introduced the Duflo isomorphism, an isomorphism between the center of the enveloping algebra of a finite-dimensional Lie algebra and the invariants of its symmetric algebra.

In 1974 he was an invited speaker at the International Congress of Mathematicians in Vancouver (Inversion formula and invariant differential operators on solvable Lie groups). Duflo received the Prix Le Conte of the French Academy of Sciences; in 1986 he became a corresponding member of the Academy.

His students include Laurent Clozel.

His daughter is the Nobel prize-winning economist Esther Duflo.
