= Alexander Goncharov =

Soviet American mathematician

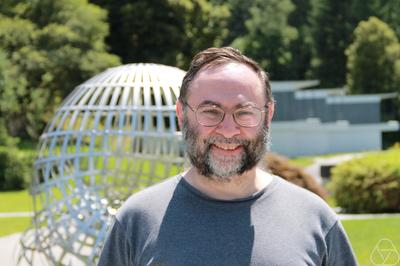
Alexander Goncharov

Alexander B. Goncharov (born April 7, 1960) is a Soviet American mathematician and the Philip Schuyler Beebe Professor of Mathematics at Yale University. He won the EMS Prize in 1992.

Goncharov won a gold medal at the International Mathematical Olympiad in 1976. He attained his doctorate at Lomonosov Moscow State University in 1987, under supervision of Israel Gelfand with thesis Generalized conformal structures on manifolds. Goncharov was an Invited Speaker at the 1994 International Congress of Mathematicians and gave a talk Polylogarithms in arithmetic and geometry.

In 2019, Goncharov was appointed the Philip Schuyler Beebe Professor of Mathematics at Yale University, as well as the Gretchen and Barry Mazur Chair at the Institut des hautes études scientifiques.

Vesselin Dimitrov was a PhD student of his.

== Selected publications ==
- Goncharov, A.B. (1995). "Geometry of configurations, polylogarithms, and motivic cohomology". Advances in Mathematics. 114 (2): 197–318. doi:10.1006/aima.1995.1045.
- (with A. M. Levin) Goncharov, A. B.; Levin, A. M. (1998). "Zagier's conjecture on L(E,2)". Inventiones Mathematicae. 132 (2): 393–432. Bibcode:1998InMat.132..393G. doi:10.1007/s002220050228.
- Goncharov, Alexander (1999). "Volumes of hyperbolic manifolds and mixed Tate motives". Journal of the American Mathematical Society. 12 (2): 569–618. doi:10.1090/S0894-0347-99-00293-3.
- (with P. Deligne) Deligne, P.; Goncharov, A. (2005), "Groupes fondamentaux motiviques de Tate mixte", Annales Scientifiques de l'École Normale Supérieure, 38 (1): 1–56, arXiv:math/0302267, doi:10.1016/j.ansens.2004.11.001, S2CID 119144154
- (with V. V. Fock) Fock, Vladimir; Goncharov, Alexander (2006). "Moduli spaces of local systems and higher Teichmüller theory". Publications Mathématiques de l'IHÉS. 103: 1–211. arXiv:math/0311149. doi:10.1007/s10240-006-0039-4.
- (with V. V. Fock) Fock, V.V.; Goncharov, A.B. (2009). "The quantum dilogarithm and representations of quantum cluster varieties". Inventiones Mathematicae. 175 (2): 223–286. arXiv:math/0702397. doi:10.1007/s00222-008-0149-3.
- (with H. Gangl, A. Levin) Gangl, Herbert; Goncharov, Alexander B.; Levin, Andrey (2007). "Multiple logarithms, algebraic cycles and trees". In Cartier, Pierre; Moussa, Pierre; Julia, Bernard; Vanhove, Pierre (eds.). Frontiers in Number Theory, Physics and Geometry. Vol. 2. Springer Verlag. pp. 759–774. arXiv:math/0504552. doi:10.1007/978-3-540-30308-4_16. ISBN 978-3-540-30307-7. S2CID 201209.
- (with V. V. Fock) Goncharov, Alexander B.; Fock, Vladimir V. (2009). "Cluster ensembles, quantization and the dilogarithm". Annales Scientifiques de l'École Normale Supérieure. 42 (6): 865–930. arXiv:math/0311245. doi:10.24033/asens.2112.
- (with R. Kenyon) Kenyon, Richard; Goncharov, Alexander B. (2013). "Dimers and cluster integrable systems". Annales Scientifiques de l'École Normale Supérieure. 46 (5): 747–813. arXiv:1107.5588. doi:10.24033/asens.2201. S2CID 17940641.
- (with T. Dimofte, M. Gabella) Dimofte, Tudor; Gabella, Maxime; Goncharov, Alexander B. (2016). "K-decompositions and 3d gauge theories". Journal of High Energy Physics. 2016 (11): #151. arXiv:1301.0192. Bibcode:2016JHEP...11..151D. doi:10.1007/JHEP11(2016)151.
- (with J. Golden, M. Spradlin, C. Vergu, A. Volovich) Golden, J. K.; Goncharov, A. B.; Spradlin, M.; Vergu, C.; Volovich, A. (2014). "Motivic Amplitudes and Cluster Coordinates". Journal of High Energy Physics. 2014 91: #91. arXiv:1305.1617. Bibcode:2014JHEP...01..091G. doi:10.1007/JHEP01(2014)091.

== See also ==
- Goncharov conjecture
