= Jean-Pierre Wintenberger =

French mathematician (1954–2019)

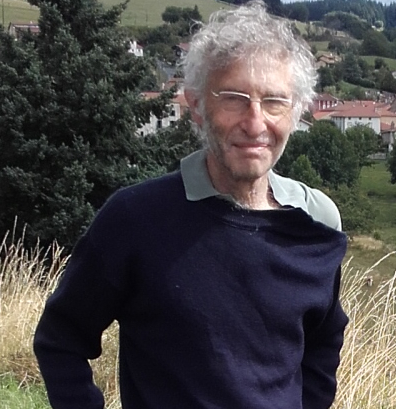
- Born: 1954; Neuilly-sur-Seine
- Died: 23 January 2019 (aged 64–65)
- Education: Joseph Fourier University
- Known for: Proof of Serre's conjecture
- Awards: Cole Prize (2011)
- Scientific career
- Fields: Mathematics
- Workplaces: University of Strasbourg
- Doctoral advisor: Jean-Marc Fontaine

Jean-Pierre Wintenberger (1954 – 23 January 2019) was a French mathematician and a professor of mathematics at the University of Strasbourg. He was corecipient of the 2011 Cole Prize in number theory, along with Chandrashekhar Khare, for his proof of Serre's modularity conjecture.

Wintenberger earned his Ph.D. at Joseph Fourier University in 1984, under supervision of Jean-Marc Fontaine.

Wintenberger died on 23 January 2019.
