= Michael Harris (mathematician) =

American mathematician

- Born: Michael Howard Harris; 1954 (age 71–72); Philadelphia, US
- Education: Harvard University; Princeton University
- Awards: Sophie Germain Prize (2006); Clay Research Award (joint, 2007); Grand Prix Scientifique de la Fondation Simone et Cino del Duca (2009); Member of the Academia Europaea (2016); Fellow of the American Mathematical Society (2019); Member of the American Academy of Arts and Sciences (2019); Member of the National Academy of Sciences (2022)
- Scientific career
- Fields: Mathematics
- Workplaces: Columbia University; Paris Diderot University; Brandeis University
- Thesis: On p-Adic Representations Arising from Descent on Abelian Varieties (1977)
- Doctoral advisor: Barry Mazur
- Doctoral students: Gaëtan Chenevier; Laurent Fargues

Michael Howard Harris (born 1954) is an American mathematician known for his work in number theory. He is a professor of mathematics at Columbia University and professor emeritus of mathematics at Université Paris Cité. In 2025, he was elected to the American Philosophical Society.

== Early life and education ==
Harris was born in Kingsessing, Philadelphia, Pennsylvania and is of Jewish descent. He received his B.A. in mathematics from Princeton University in 1973. He received his M.A. and Ph.D. in mathematics from Harvard University under the supervision of Barry Mazur in 1976 and 1977 respectively.

== Career ==
Harris was a faculty member at Brandeis University from 1977 to 1994. In 1994, he became a professor of mathematics at Paris Diderot University and the Institut de mathématiques de Jussieu – Paris Rive Gauche, where he has been emeritus since 2021. He became a professor of mathematics at Columbia University in 2013.

He was a member of the Institute for Advanced Study from 1983 to 1984 and in the spring of 2011. He has held visiting positions at various institutions, including Bethlehem University, the Steklov Institute of Mathematics, the Institut des Hautes Études Scientifiques, Oxford University, and the Mathematical Sciences Research Institute.

His former doctoral students include Laurent Fargues and Gaëtan Chenevier.

He has organized or co-organized more than 20 conferences, workshops, and special programs in his field of number theory.

== Work ==
=== Research ===
Harris's research focuses on arithmetic geometry, automorphic forms, L-functions, and motives. He has developed the theory of coherent cohomology of Shimura varieties and applied it to number theoretic problems on special values of L-functions, Galois representations, and the theta correspondence. His later work focuses on geometric aspects of the Langlands program.

In 2001, Harris and Richard Taylor proved the local Langlands conjecture for GL(n) over a p-adic local field The Sato–Tate conjecture and its generalization to all totally real fields was proved by Laurent Clozel, Harris, Nicholas Shepherd-Barron, and Richard Taylor under mild assumptions in 2008, and completed by Thomas Barnet-Lamb, David Geraghty, Harris, and Taylor in 2011.

=== Mathematics without Apologies ===
Harris wrote the book Mathematics without Apologies: Portrait of a Problematic Vocation, published in 2015.

=== Silicon Reckoner ===
Since 2021, Harris has written the newsletter Silicon Reckoner exploring questions and issues related to the mechanization of mathematics and artificial intelligence.

== Recognition ==
Harris received the Sophie Germain Prize (2006), the Clay Research Award (joint with Richard Taylor, 2007), the Grand Prix Scientifique de la Fondation Simone et Cino del Duca (2009), He is a two-time invited speaker at the International Congress of Mathematicians (2002, 2014).

Harris was a Sloan Research Fellow (1983–1985) and a member of the Institut Universitaire de France (2001–2011) He has been elected a Member of the Academia Europaea (2016), Fellow of the American Mathematical Society (2019), Member of the American Academy of Arts and Sciences (2019), and Member of the National Academy of Sciences (2022).
