= Laurent Fargues =

French mathematician

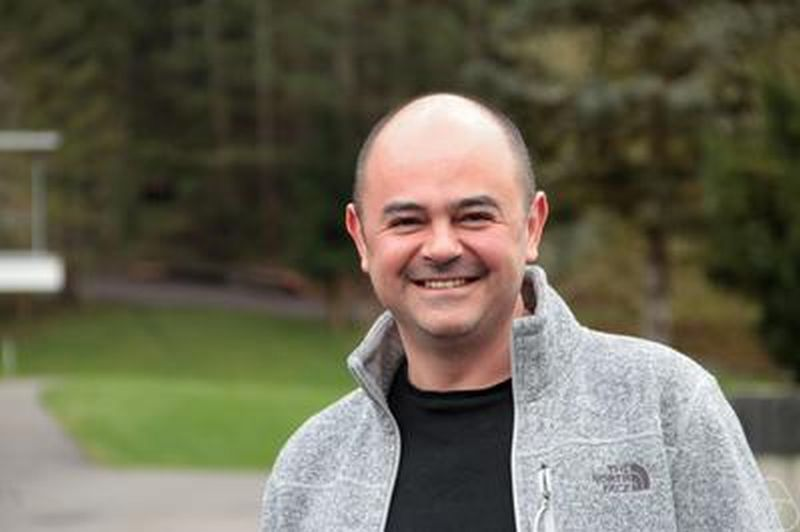
- Fargues at Oberwolfach, 2016
- Born: 19 June 1975 (age 51); Cagnes-sur-Mer
- Scientific career
- Fields: Mathematics
- Thesis: Correspondances de Langlands locale dans la cohomologie des espaces de Rapoport-Zink.
- Doctoral advisor: Michael Harris

Laurent Fargues (born 19 July 1975 in Cagnes-sur-Mer) is a French mathematician working in number theory and arithmetic geometry.

Fargues was an invited speaker at the International Congress of Mathematicians in 2018 in Rio de Janeiro.

== Career ==
Fargues received his doctorate in 2001 under Michael Harris at Paris Diderot University (Paris 7, Institut de Mathématiques de Jussieu) and his habilitation in 2009 at Paris-Sud University in Orsay. From 2002 to 2011, Fargues was a chargé de recherches at the CNRS in Orsay, from 2011 to 2013 he was CNRS research director at the IRMA in Strasbourg and, from 2013, CNRS research director at the l'Institut de mathématiques de Jussieu in Paris (a campus of the Sorbonne University).

Fargues' work mainly centers around the study of Shimura varieties, p-divisible groups and their moduli spaces, and p-adic Hodge theory. One of his most significant contributions has been to link the local Langlands correspondence with the Fargues–Fontaine curve, an object introduced by Fargues together with Jean-Marc Fontaine. In particular, Fargues has formulated a general geometric conjecture which refines the classical local Langlands conjecture, and at the same time introduces extra structure which mirrors the more categorical formulation of the geometric Langlands conjecture. These works were (in part) the subject of a Séminaire Bourbaki exposé in 2018 by Matthew Morrow and an Arbeitsgemeinschaft meeting at Oberwolfach in 2016. His work with Peter Scholze on the stack of vector bundles on the Fargues–Fontaine curve is expected to have implications for the construction of a local Langlands correspondence for general groups.

Fargues gave the Peccot course at the Collège de France in the spring of 2004, was awarded the Petit d'Ormoy, Carriere, Thebault prize from the French academy of sciences in 2009, and was an invited speaker at the International Congress of Mathematicians 2018 in Rio de Janeiro in both the number theory and algebraic geometry sessions.

== Selected publications ==
- Cohomologie des espaces de modules de groupes p-divisibles et correspondances de Langlands locales, Asterisque, vol. 291, 2004, pp. 1–200
- Application de Hodge-Tate duale d’un groupe de Lubin-Tate, immeuble de Bruhat-Tits du groupe linéaire et filtrations de ramifications, Duke Math J. vol.140, 2007, No. 3, Arxiv
- with Alain Genestier, Vincent Lafforgue: L’isomorphisme entres les tours de Lubin-Tate et de Drinfeld, Birkhäuser, Progress in Mathematics, vol. 262, 2008
- Filtration de monodromie et cycles evanescents formels, Inventiones Mathematicae, vol. 177, 2009, pp. 281–305, Arxiv
- with Jean-Marc Fontaine: Vector bundles and p-adic Galois representations, AMS/IP Studies in Advanced Mathematics, vol. 51, 2011
- with J-M. Fontaine: Vector bundles on curves and p-adic Hodge theory, in: Automorphic Forms and Galois Representation, London Mathematical Society Lecture Note Series, Volume 415, Cambridge University Press, 2014
- From local class field to the curve and vice versa, Proc. AMS 2015 Summer Research Institute on Algebraic Geometry, Salt Lake City
- with Fontaine: Courbes et fibrés vectoriels en théorie de Hodge p-adique, Astérisque, Preprint 2017
- Geometrization of the local Langlands correspondence: an overview, Arxiv 2016
- Fargues, Laurent (2022). "Groupes analytiques rigides p-divisibles II" (PDF). Mathematische Annalen. 387 (1–2): 245–264. arXiv:1901.08272. doi:10.1007/s00208-022-02453-1.
