= P-adic modular form =

In mathematics, a p-adic modular form is a modular form, with coefficients that are p-adic numbers rather than complex numbers. Jean-Pierre Serre introduced p-adic modular forms as limits of ordinary modular forms, and Nick Katz shortly afterwards gave a geometric and more general definition. Katz's p-adic modular forms include as special cases classical p-adic modular forms, which are more or less p-adic linear combinations of the usual classical modular forms, and overconvergent p-adic modular forms, which in turn include Haruzo Hida's ordinary modular forms as special cases.

== Definition ==
=== Serre's construction ===
Serre defined a p-adic modular form to be a formal power series with p-adic coefficients that is a p-adic limit of classical modular forms with integer coefficients. The weights of these classical modular forms need not be the same; in fact, if they are then the p-adic modular form is nothing more than a linear combination of classical modular forms. In general the weight of a p-adic modular form is a p-adic number, given by the limit of the weights of the classical modular forms; in fact, a slight refinement gives a weight in $\Z_p\times \Z/(p-1)\Z$.

The p-adic modular forms defined by Serre are special cases of those defined by Katz.

=== Katz's construction ===
A classical modular form of weight k can be thought of roughly as a function f from pairs (E,ω) of a complex elliptic curve with a holomorphic 1-form ω to complex numbers, such that f(E,λω) = λ^{−k}f(E,ω), and satisfying some additional conditions such as being holomorphic in some sense.

Katz's definition of a p-adic modular form is similar, except that E is now an elliptic curve over some algebra R (with p nilpotent) over the ring of integers R_{0} of a finite extension of the p-adic numbers, such that E is not supersingular, in the sense that the Eisenstein series E_{p–1} is invertible at (E,ω). The p-adic modular form f now takes values in R rather than in the complex numbers. The p-adic modular form also has to satisfy some other conditions analogous to the condition that a classical modular form should be holomorphic.

== Overconvergent forms ==
Overconvergent p-adic modular forms are similar to the modular forms defined by Katz, except that the form has to be defined on a larger collection of elliptic curves. Roughly speaking, the value of the Eisenstein series E_{k–1} on the form is no longer required to be invertible, but can be a smaller element of R. Informally the series for the modular form converges on this larger collection of elliptic curves, hence the name "overconvergent".
