= Stefaan Vaes =

Belgian mathematician (born 1976)

Stefaan Vaes (born February 29, 1976, in Herentals, Belgium) is a Belgian mathematician.

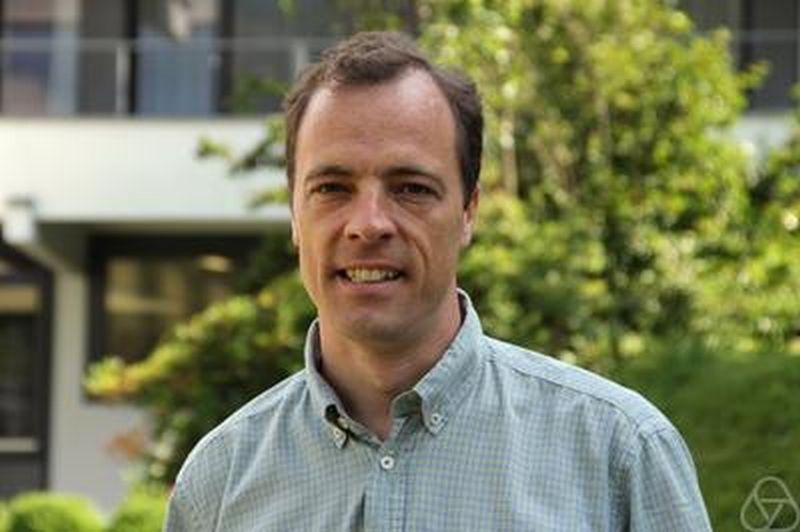
Stefaan Vaes, Oberwolfach, 2015

Vaes studied mathematics at KU Leuven with a diploma in 1998 and a PhD in 2001 with thesis advisor Alfons Van Daele and thesis Locally Compact Quantum Groups. As a postdoc, he worked from 1998 to 2002 at KU Leuven and from 1998 to 2002 in Paris, where he did research for CNRS. In 2002, he began part-time teaching at KU Leuven, where he became an associate professor in 2006 and a full professor in 2009.

He was a visiting professor in 2009 at Pierre and Marie Curie University (Paris VI) and in 2011 at Paris Diderot University (Paris VII) (where he habilitated in 2004). In 2005, he held the Peccot Chair at the Collège de France.

His research deals with Von Neumann algebras and quantum groups.

In 2010, Vaes was an invited speaker with a talk on Rigidity for von Neumann algebras and their invariants at the International Congress of Mathematicians in Hyderabad. In 2012, he was elected a Fellow of the American Mathematical Society. In 2015, he received the Francqui Prize.

His doctoral students include Cyril Houdayer.

== Selected references ==
- Kustermans, Johan; Vaes, Stefaan (2000). "Locally compact quantum groups" (PDF). Annales Scientifiques de l'École Normale Supérieure. 33 (6). Societe Mathematique de France: 837–934. doi:10.1016/s0012-9593(00)01055-7. ISSN 0012-9593.
- Kustermans, Johan; Vaes, Stefaan (2000). "Locally compact quantum groups in the von Neumann algebraic setting". arXiv:math/0005219.
- Kustermans, Johan; Vaes, Stefaan (18 January 2000). "The operator algebra approach to quantum groups". Proceedings of the National Academy of Sciences. 97 (2): 547–552. Bibcode:2000PNAS...97..547K. doi:10.1073/pnas.97.2.547. ISSN 0027-8424. PMC 33964. PMID 10639116.
- Ioana, Adrian; Popa, Sorin; Vaes, Stefaan (2010). "A class of superrigid group von Neumann algebras". arXiv:1007.1412.
- Popa, Sorin; Vaes, Stefaan (2009). "Group measure space decomposition of II1 factors and W*-superrigidity". Inventiones Mathematicae. 182 (2): 371–417. arXiv:0906.2765. doi:10.1007/s00222-010-0268-5. S2CID 16581675.

== See also ==
- Locally compact quantum group
