= Nick Katz =

American mathematician (born 1943)

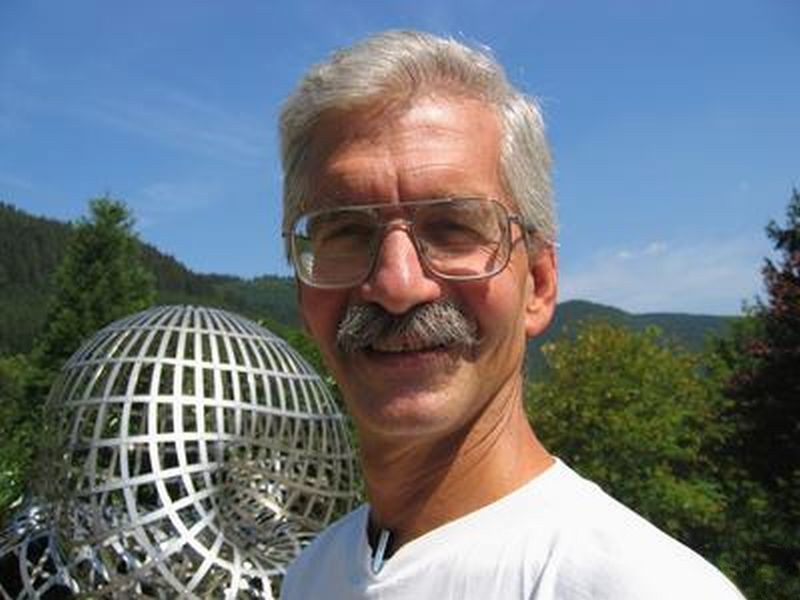
- Born: Nicholas Michael Katz; December 7, 1943 (age 82); Baltimore, Maryland, US
- Education: Johns Hopkins University Princeton University
- Known for: Katz–Lang finiteness theorem Ax–Katz theorem Grothendieck–Katz p-curvature conjecture Overconvergent modular form p-adic modular form
- Awards: Sloan Fellowship (1970); Guggenheim Fellowship (1975); Levi L. Conant Prize (2003); Leroy P. Steele Prize (2023)
- Scientific career
- Fields: Mathematics
- Workplaces: Princeton University
- Doctoral advisor: Bernard Dwork
- Doctoral students: William Messing; Neal Koblitz; Mark Kisin; Chris Hall; Will Sawin

Nicholas Michael Katz (/kæts/; born December 7, 1943) is an American mathematician, working in arithmetic geometry, particularly on p-adic methods, monodromy and moduli problems, and number theory. He is currently a professor of Mathematics at Princeton University and an editor of the journal Annals of Mathematics.

== Life and work ==
Katz graduated from Johns Hopkins University (BA 1964) and from Princeton University, where in 1965 he received his master's degree and in 1966 he received his doctorate under supervision of Bernard Dwork with thesis On the Differential Equations Satisfied by Period Matrices. After that, at Princeton, he was an instructor, an assistant professor in 1968, associate professor in 1971 and professor in 1974. From 2002 to 2005 he was the chairman of faculty there. He was also a visiting scholar at the University of Minnesota, the University of Kyoto, Paris VI, Orsay Faculty of Sciences, the Institute for Advanced Study and the IHES. While in France, he adapted methods of scheme theory and category theory to the theory of modular forms. Subsequently, he has applied geometric methods to various exponential sums.

From 1968 to 1969, he was a NATO Postdoctoral Fellow, from 1975 to 1976 and from 1987–1988 Guggenheim Fellow and from 1971 to 1972 Sloan Fellow. In 1970 he was an invited speaker at the International Congress of Mathematicians in Nice (The regularity theorem in algebraic geometry) and in 1978 in Helsinki (p-adic L functions, Serre-Tate local moduli and ratios of solutions of differential equations).

Since 2003 he is a member of the American Academy of Arts and Sciences and since 2004 the National Academy of Sciences. In 2003 he was awarded with Peter Sarnak the Levi L. Conant Prize of the American Mathematical Society (AMS) for the essay "Zeroes of Zeta Functions and Symmetry" in the Bulletin of the American Mathematical Society. Since 2004 he is an editor of the Annals of Mathematics. In 2023 he received from the AMS the Leroy P. Steele Prize for Lifetime Achievement.

He played a significant role as a sounding-board for Andrew Wiles when Wiles was developing in secret his proof of Fermat's Last Theorem. Mathematician and cryptographer Neal Koblitz was one of Katz's students.

Katz studied, with Sarnak among others, the connection of the eigenvalue distribution of large random matrices of classical groups to the distribution of the distances of the zeros of various L and zeta functions in algebraic geometry. He also studied trigonometric sums (Gauss sums) with algebro-geometric methods.

He introduced the Katz–Lang finiteness theorem.

== Writings ==
- Gauss sums, Kloosterman sums, and monodromy groups. Annals of Mathematics Studies, Princeton 1988.
- Exponential sums and differential equations. Annals of Mathematics Studies, Princeton 1990. Manuscript with corrections
- Rigid Local Systems. Annals of Mathematics Studies, Princeton 1996.
- Twisted $L$-functions and Monodromy. Annals of Mathematics Studies, Princeton 2002.
- Moments, Monodromy, and Perversity. A Diophantine Perspective. Annals of Mathematics Studies, Princeton 2005, ISBN 0691123306.
- Convolution and equidistribution: Sato-Tate theorems for finite-field Mellin transforms. Annals of Annals of Mathematics Studies, Princeton 2012.
- With Barry Mazur: Arithmetic moduli of elliptic curves. Annals of Mathematics Studies, 108. Princeton University Press. 1985. ISBN 0-691-08349-5. MR 0772569.
- With Peter Sarnak: Random Matrices, Frobenius Eigenvalues, and Monodromy. AMS Colloquium publications 1998, ISBN 0821810170.
- With Peter Sarnak: "Zeroes of zeta functions and symmetry". Bulletin of the AMS, Vol. 36, 1999, S.1-26.
