= Serre's modularity conjecture =

Theorem in number theory

- Field: Algebraic number theory
- Conjectured by: Jean-Pierre Serre
- Conjectured in: 1975
- First proof by: Chandrashekhar Khare; Jean-Pierre Wintenberger
- First proof in: 2008

In mathematics, Serre's modularity conjecture, introduced by Jean-Pierre Serre (1975, 1987), states that an odd, irreducible, two-dimensional Galois representation over a finite field arises from a modular form. A stronger version of this conjecture specifies the weight and level of the modular form. The conjecture in the level 1 case was proved by Chandrashekhar Khare in 2005, and a proof of the full conjecture was completed jointly by Khare and Jean-Pierre Wintenberger in 2008.

== Formulation ==
The conjecture concerns the absolute Galois group $G_\mathbb{Q}$ of the rational number field $\mathbb{Q}$.

Let $\rho$ be an absolutely irreducible, continuous, two-dimensional representation of $G_\mathbb{Q}$ over a finite field $F = \mathbb{F}_{\ell^r}$.

$$\rho \colon G_\mathbb{Q} \rightarrow \mathrm{GL}_2(F).$$

Additionally, assume $\rho$ is odd, meaning the image of complex conjugation has determinant -1.

To any normalized modular eigenform

$$f = q+a_2q^2+a_3q^3+\cdots$$

of level $N=N(\rho)$, weight $k=k(\rho)$, and some Nebentype character

$$\chi \colon \mathbb{Z}/N\mathbb{Z} \rightarrow F^*$$,

a theorem due to Shimura, Deligne, and Serre-Deligne attaches to $f$ a representation

$$\rho_f\colon G_\mathbb{Q} \rightarrow \mathrm{GL}_2(\mathcal{O}),$$

where $\mathcal{O}$ is the ring of integers in a finite extension of $\mathbb{Q}_\ell$. This representation is characterized by the condition that for all prime numbers $p$, coprime to $N\ell$ we have

$$\operatorname{Trace}(\rho_f(\operatorname{Frob}_p))=a_p$$

and

$$\det(\rho_f(\operatorname{Frob}_p))=p^{k-1} \chi(p).$$

Reducing this representation modulo, the maximal ideal of $\mathcal{O}$ gives a mod $\ell$ representation $\overline{\rho_f}$ of $G_\mathbb{Q}$.

Serre's conjecture asserts that for any representation $\rho$ as above, there is a modular eigenform $f$ such that

$$\overline{\rho_f} \cong \rho$$.

The level and weight of the conjectural form $f$ are explicitly conjectured in Serre's article. In addition, he derives a number of results from this conjecture, among them Fermat's Last Theorem and the now-proven Taniyama–Weil (or Taniyama–Shimura) conjecture, now known as the modularity theorem (although this implies Fermat's Last Theorem, Serre proves it directly from his conjecture).

== Optimal level and weight ==
The strong form of Serre's conjecture describes the level and weight of the modular form.

The optimal level is the Artin conductor of the representation, with the power of $l$ removed.

== Proof ==
A proof of the level 1 and small weight cases of the conjecture was obtained in 2004 by Chandrashekhar Khare and Jean-Pierre Wintenberger, using P-adic L-functions, supersingular elliptic curves, and a theorem from Mark Kisin. Another proof was independently published by Luis Dieulefait in 2007.

In 2005, Chandrashekhar Khare obtained a proof of the level 1 case of Serre conjecture, and in 2008 a proof of the full conjecture in collaboration with Jean-Pierre Wintenberger.

== See also ==
- Wiles's proof of Fermat's Last Theorem
