= Yunqing Tang =

Chinese mathematician

- 唐云清
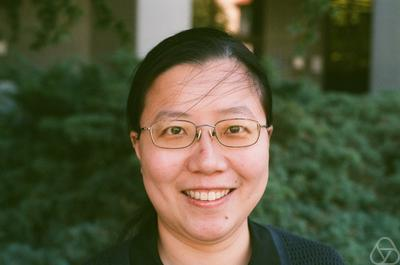
- Tang in 2022
- Born: Tang Yunqing; July 1989 (age 37); China
- Education: Peking University (BS); Harvard University (PhD)
- Awards: SASTRA Ramanujan Prize (2022); AWM–Microsoft Research Prize in Algebra and Number Theory (2024); Cole Prize (2026); New Horizons in Mathematics Prize (2026)
- Scientific career
- Fields: Mathematics
- Institutions: Institute for Advanced Study; Princeton University; CNRS; University of California, Berkeley

Yunqing Tang (Chinese: 唐云清; born July 1989) is a Chinese mathematician specialising in number theory and arithmetic geometry. She is a professor of mathematics at the University of California, Berkeley. She was awarded the SASTRA Ramanujan Prize in 2022 for "having established, by herself and in collaboration, a number of striking results on some central problems in arithmetic geometry and number theory".

== Early life and education ==
Tang was born in China. She graduated from Peking University with a Bachelor of Science in 2011, then earned her Ph.D. in mathematics from Harvard University in 2016 under Mark Kisin. She was associated with Princeton University in several capacities. First she was with the IAS Princeton during 2016–2017, then as an instructor from July 2017 to Jan 2020 and then as an assistant professor from July 2021 to June 2022, In between, she worked as a researcher at CNRS from February 2020 to June 2021. She has been a member of the faculty of the University of California, Berkeley, since July 2022.

== Work ==
In collaboration with Vesselin Dimitrov and Frank Calegari, Tang proved the unbounded denominators conjecture of A.O.L. Atkin and Swinnerton-Dyer: if a modular form f(τ) is not modular for some congruence subgroup of the modular group, then the Fourier coefficients of f(τ) have unbounded denominators. It has been known for decades that if f(τ) is modular for some congruence subgroup, then its coefficients have bounded denominators.

Also in collaboration with Dimitrov and Calegari, she proved the linear independence of $1, \zeta(2),$ and $L(2,\chi_{-3}).$

The citation for SASTRA Ramnujan Prize summarizes Yunqing Tang's contributions to mathematics thus:

"The prize notes that her works display a remarkable combination of sophisticated techniques, in which the arithmetic and geometry of modular curves and of Shimura varieties play a central role, and have strong links with the discoveries of Srinivasa Ramanujan in the area of modular equations. ... she established a new special case of the Ogus conjecture concerning cycles in de Rham cohomology of abelian varieties. She has shown that any abelian surface with real multiplication has infinitely many primes with split reduction. She resolved the long-standing unbounded denominators conjecture of Atkin and Swinnerton-Dyer that algebraic functions which are not invariant under any congruence subgroup of SL2(Z), must have unbounded denominators. The study of algebraic functions that are related to the moduli of elliptic integrals, stems from Ramanujan’s own investigations and the plethora of beautiful modular identities that he discovered."

== Awards and recognition ==
The awards and recognition conferred on Yunqing Tang include:

- 2026 – New Horizons in Mathematics Prize jointly with Vesselin Dimitrov.
- 2026 – Cole Prize in Number Theory jointly with Frank Calegari and Vesselin Dimitrov.
- 2024 – AWM–Microsoft Research Prize in Algebra and Number Theory
- 2022 – SASTRA Ramanujan Prize
- 2016 – AWM Dissertation Prize, awarded for outstanding Ph.D dissertations by female students in the US
- 2016 – New World Mathematics Award, Gold Medal for Ph.D thesis awarded for outstanding Chinese mathematics students worldwide
- 2015–2016 – Merit Research Fellowship, Graduate School of Arts and Sciences, Harvard University
