= Nicholas Shepherd-Barron =

British mathematician

- Born: Nicholas Ian Shepherd-Barron; March 17, 1955 (age 71)
- Scientific career
- Workplaces: University of Cambridge, King's College London
- Thesis: Some Questions on Singularities in Two and Three Dimensions (1981)
- Doctoral advisor: Miles Reid
- Website: www.kcl.ac.uk/people/nicholas-shepherd-barron

Nicholas Ian Shepherd-Barron, FRS (born 17 March 1955), is a British mathematician working in algebraic geometry. He is a professor of mathematics at King's College London.

== Education and career ==
Shepherd-Barron was a scholar of Winchester College. He obtained his B.A. at Jesus College, Cambridge in 1976, and received his Ph.D. at the University of Warwick under the supervision of Miles Reid in 1981.

In 2013, he moved from the University of Cambridge to King's College London.

== Research ==
Shepherd-Barron works in various aspects of algebraic geometry, such as: singularities in the minimal model program; compactification of moduli spaces; the rationality of orbit spaces, including the moduli spaces of curves of genus 4 and 6; the geography of algebraic surfaces in positive characteristic, including a proof of Raynaud's conjecture; canonical models (Note: in the sense of birational geometry, not that of Shimura varieties) of moduli spaces of abelian varieties; the Schottky problem at the boundary; the relation between algebraic groups and del Pezzo surfaces; the period map for elliptic surfaces.

In 2008, with the number theorists Michael Harris and Richard Taylor, he proved the original version of the Sato–Tate conjecture and its generalization to totally real fields, under mild assumptions.

== Awards and honors ==
Shepherd-Barron was elected Fellow of the Royal Society in 2006.

== Personal life ==
He is the son of John Shepherd-Barron, a British inventor, who was responsible for inventing the first cash machine in 1967.
