= Toby Gee =

British mathematician (born 1980)

Toby Stephen Gee FRS
- Born: 2 January 1980 (age 46)
- Education: Trinity College, Cambridge
- Awards: Whitehead Prize (2012); Leverhulme Prize (2012); Fellow of the American Mathematical Society (2013)
- Scientific career
- Fields: Mathematics
- Workplaces: Imperial College London; Harvard University
- Thesis: Companion Forms Over Totally Real Fields (2004)
- Doctoral advisor: Kevin Buzzard

Toby Stephen Gee FRS (born 2 January 1980) is a British mathematician working in number theory and arithmetic aspects of the Langlands Program. He specialises in algebraic number theory.

Gee was awarded the Whitehead Prize in 2012, the Leverhulme Prize in 2012, and was elected as a Fellow of the American Mathematical Society in 2014 and of the Royal Society in 2024.

== Career ==
Gee read mathematics at Trinity College, Cambridge, where he was Senior Wrangler in 2000. After completing his PhD with Kevin Buzzard at Imperial College in 2004, he was a Benjamin Peirce Assistant Professor at Harvard University until 2010. From 2010 to 2011 Gee was an assistant professor at Northwestern University, at which point he moved to Imperial College London, where he has been a professor since 2013.

With Mark Kisin, he proved the Breuil–Mézard conjecture for potentially Barsotti–Tate representations, and with Thomas Barnet-Lamb and David Geraghty, he proved the Sato–Tate conjecture for Hilbert modular forms. One of his most influential ideas has been the introduction of a general 'philosophy of weights', which has clarified some aspects of the emerging mod p Langlands philosophy.
