= Mark Kisin =

Australian mathematician

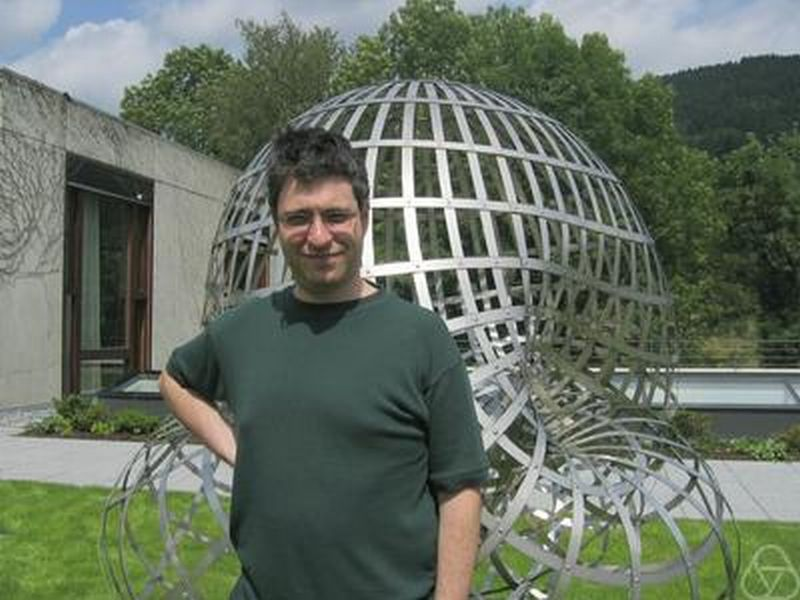
- Kisin in 2007
- Born: 10 August 1971 (age 55); Vilnius, then part of the Lithuanian SSR, Soviet Union
- Education: Monash University; Princeton University
- Awards: American Academy of Arts and Sciences (2022); American Mathematical Society Fellow (2012); Fellow of the Royal Society (2008)
- Scientific career
- Fields: Mathematics
- Workplaces: Harvard University; University of Chicago; University of Münster; University of Sydney
- Thesis: Local constancy in p-adic families of Galois representations (1998)
- Doctoral advisor: Nicholas M. Katz
- Doctoral students: Yunqing Tang
- Website: people.math.harvard.edu/~kisin

Mark Kisin is a mathematician known for work in algebraic number theory and arithmetic geometry. In particular, he is known for his contributions to the study of p-adic representations and p-adic cohomology.

Born in Vilnius, Lithuania and raised from the age of five in Melbourne, Australia, he won a silver medal at the International Mathematical Olympiad in 1989 and received his B.Sc. from Monash University in 1991. He received his Ph.D. from Princeton University in 1998 under the direction of Nick Katz. From 1998 to 2001 he was a Research Fellow at the University of Sydney, after which he spent three years at the University of Münster.

After six years at the University of Chicago, Kisin took the post in 2009 of professor of mathematics at Harvard University.

He was elected a Fellow of the Royal Society in 2008. He gave an invited talk at the International Congress of Mathematicians in 2010, on the topic of "Number Theory". In 2012 he became a fellow of the American Mathematical Society. He was elected to the American Academy of Arts and Sciences in 2022.
