= Haruzo Hida =

Japanese mathematician (born 1952)

Haruzo Hida (肥田 晴三 Hida Haruzo, born 6 August 1952, Sakai, Osaka) is a Japanese mathematician, known for his research in number theory, algebraic geometry, and modular forms.

Hida received from Kyoto University a B.A. in 1975, an M.A. in 1977, and a Ph.D. in 1980 with thesis On Abelian Varieties with Complex Multiplication as Factors of the Jacobians of Shimura Curves, although he left Kyoto University in 1977. He was from 1977 to 1984 an assistant professor and from 1984 to 1987 an associate professor at Hokkaidō University. Since 1987 he has been a professor at the University of California, Los Angeles. From 1979 to 1981 he was a visiting scholar at the Institute for Advanced Study.

Hida was an invited speaker at the International Congress of Mathematicians (Berkeley) in 1986. In 1991 he was awarded the Guggenheim Fellowship. Hida received in 1992 for his research on p-adic L-functions of algebraic groups and p-adic Hecke rings the Spring Prize of the Mathematical Society of Japan. In 2012 he was elected a Fellow of the American Mathematical Society. He received the 2019 Leroy P. Steele Prize for Seminal Contribution to Research for his highly original paper "Galois representations into GL_{2}($\Z$_{p}[[X]]) attached to ordinary cusp forms," published in 1986 in Inventiones Mathematicae.

== Selected works ==
- Elementary theory of L-functions and Eisenstein series, Cambridge University Press, 1993
- Modular forms and Galois cohomology, Cambridge University Press, 2000
- Geometric modular forms and elliptic curves, World Scientific, 2000
- p-Adic automorphic forms on Shimura varieties, Springer, 2004
- Hilbert modular forms and Iwasawa theory, Oxford University Press, 2006
