= Richard Taylor (mathematician) =

British-American mathematician (born 1962)

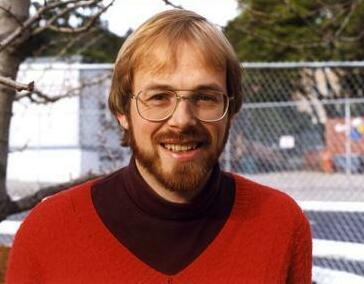
- Taylor in 1999
- Born: Richard Lawrence Taylor; 19 May 1962 (age 64); Cambridge, England
- Education: University of Cambridge (BA); Princeton University (PhD)
- Awards: Whitehead Prize (1990); Fermat Prize (2001); Ostrowski Prize (2001); Cole Prize (2002); Shaw Prize (2007); Clay Research Award (2007); Breakthrough Prize in Mathematics (2015)
- Scientific career
- Fields: Mathematics
- Workplaces: University of Oxford; Harvard University; Institute for Advanced Study; Stanford University
- Thesis: On congruences between modular forms (1988)
- Doctoral advisor: Andrew Wiles
- Doctoral students: Kevin Buzzard; Ana Caraiani; Elena Mantovan

Richard Lawrence Taylor (born 19 May 1962) is a British-American mathematician specialising in number theory. He is currently the Barbara Kimball Browning Professor in Humanities and Sciences at Stanford University in California.

Taylor received the 2002 Cole Prize, the 2007 Shaw Prize with Robert Langlands, and the 2015 Breakthrough Prize in Mathematics.

== Career ==
He received his Bachelor of Arts (B.A.) degree from the Clare College of the University of Cambridge. During his time at Cambridge, he was president of The Archimedeans in 1981 and 1982, following the resignation of his predecessor. He earned his Ph.D. degree in mathematics from Princeton University in the United States in 1988, after completing a doctoral dissertation, titled "On congruences between modular forms", under the supervision of Andrew Wiles.

He was an assistant lecturer, lecturer, and then reader at the University of Cambridge from 1988 to 1995. From 1995 to 1996 he held the Savilian chair of geometry at the University of Oxford and Fellow of New College, Oxford. He was a professor of mathematics at Harvard University from 1996 to 2012, at one point becoming the Herchel Smith Professor of Pure Mathematics. He moved to the Institute for Advanced Study in Princeton, New Jersey as the Robert and Luisa Fernholz Professorship from 2012 to 2019. He has been the Barbara Kimball Browning Professor in Humanities & Sciences at Stanford University since 2018.

== Research ==
When a gap was found in the 1993 attempt by Andrew Wiles to prove the semistable case of the Taniyama-Shimura conjecture for elliptic curves, Wiles asked Taylor to help him clarify what was required to complete the proof. Wiles eventually realized that work of Ehud de Shalit could be generalized to bypass the lacuna of 1993. Wiles and Taylor proved that a constructed Gorenstein ring that arose from this approach was also a complete intersection. This ring theoretic result essentially completed the proof of the semistable case of Taniyama-Shimura, which Wiles expounded in the same issue of the Annals of Mathematics. This proof strategy has been dubbed "Taylor-Wiles patching".

In subsequent work, Taylor (along with Michael Harris) proved the local Langlands conjectures for GL(n) over a number field. A simpler proof was suggested almost at the same time by Guy Henniart, and ten years later by Peter Scholze.

Taylor, together with Christophe Breuil, Brian Conrad and Fred Diamond, completed the proof of the Taniyama–Shimura conjecture, by performing quite heavy technical computations in the case of additive reduction.

In 2008, Taylor, following the ideas of Michael Harris and building on his joint work with Laurent Clozel, Michael Harris, and Nick Shepherd-Barron, announced a proof of the Sato–Tate conjecture, for elliptic curves with non-integral j-invariant. This partial proof of the Sato–Tate conjecture uses Wiles's theorem about modularity of semistable elliptic curves.

== Awards and honors ==
He received the Whitehead Prize in 1990, the Fermat Prize and the Ostrowski Prize in 2001, the Cole Prize of the American Mathematical Society in 2002, and the Shaw Prize for Mathematics in 2007. He received the 2015 Breakthrough Prize in Mathematics "for numerous breakthrough results in the theory of automorphic forms, including the Taniyama–Weil conjecture, the local Langlands conjecture for general linear groups, and the Sato–Tate conjecture."

He was elected a Fellow of the Royal Society in 1995. In 2012 he became a fellow of the American Mathematical Society. In 2015 he was inducted into the National Academy of Sciences. He was elected to the American Philosophical Society in 2018.

== Personal life ==
Taylor is the son of British physicist John C. Taylor. He is married and has two children.
