= Alexandru D. Ionescu =

American mathematician and academic

- Occupations: Mathematician and academic

Academic background
- Education: Massachusetts Institute of Technology (BS); Princeton University (MA, PhD)
- Thesis: Real-variable theory and Fourier integral operators on semisimple Lie groups and symmetric spaces of real rank one (1999)
- Doctoral advisor: Elias M. Stein

Academic work
- Institutions: Princeton University
- Doctoral students: Yu Deng
- Website: University site; Personal website

Alexandru Dan Ionescu is a mathematician and academic who serves as a professor of mathematics at Princeton University.

Ionescu's research primarily focuses on partial differential equations (PDEs) and mathematical physics. He is a fellow of the American Mathematical Society, a member of the American Academy of Sciences and Letters, and was an invited speaker at the International Congress of Mathematicians in 2022.

== Education and career ==
Ionescu earned his B.S. in mathematics from the Massachusetts Institute of Technology in 1995. He then obtained both his M.A. in mathematics in 1997 and his Ph.D. in mathematics in 1999 from Princeton University.

Ionescu held postdoctoral appointments at the Institute for Advanced Study and the Massachusetts Institute of Technology. In 2002, he joined the University of Wisconsin–Madison as an assistant professor, was promoted to associate professor in 2005, and became a full professor in 2008. Since 2010, he has served as a professor at Princeton University.

== Works ==
Ionescu's research spans analysis and partial differential equations, with applications to mathematical physics. His work has addressed questions of global well-posedness for nonlinear dispersive equations, including the KP-I equation, Schrödinger maps, the Benjamin–Ono equation, and water waves

Ionescu has also made contributions to harmonic analysis, particularly in ergodic theory, where he proved extensions of the Furstenberg–Bergelson–Leibman conjecture to the nilpotent setting. His research further encompasses kinetic and plasma models, including stability and scattering results for the Vlasov–Poisson system.

In addition, his work in general relativity includes proving rigidity results for Kerr black-hole solutions to the Einstein vacuum equations under specific geometric and analytic assumption.

== Awards and honors ==
- 2003 – Alfred P. Sloan research fellowship, Alfred P. Sloan Foundation
- 2004 – David and Lucile Packard Fellowship in Science and Engineering, David and Lucile Packard Foundation
- 2008 – Romnes Award, University of Wisconsin
- 2018 – Fellow of the American Mathematical Society
- 2024 – Member of the American Academy of Sciences and Letters
