= Matthew Emerton =

Australian mathematician

- Born: 9 November 1971 (age 54)
- Education: University of Melbourne
- Scientific career
- Fields: Mathematics
- Workplaces: Northwestern University; University of Chicago
- Thesis: 2-Adic Modular Forms of minimal slope (1998)
- Doctoral advisor: Barry Mazur

Matthew James Emerton (born 9 November 1971) is an Australian mathematician who is a professor of mathematics at the University of Chicago. His research interests include number theory, especially the theory of automorphic forms.

== Early life and education ==
He earned his PhD in 1998 from Harvard University (where he studied under Barry Mazur and his PhD thesis was titled "2-Adic Modular Forms of Minimal Slope") and a BS (honors) from the University of Melbourne.

== Career ==
After postdoctoral positions at the University of Michigan and the University of Chicago, Emerton joined the Northwestern University mathematics department as an assistant professor in 2001. He became an associate professor in 2005 and a full professor in 2008. He joined the University of Chicago faculty in 2011.

Emerton introduced the notion of completed cohomology, which has proved to be a useful tool in the study of the p-adic theory of automorphic forms. Using this theory, together with the work of Colmez on the p-adic Langlands program, he posted a preprint in 2011 proving many cases of the Fontaine--Mazur conjecture.

== Awards ==
Emerton was a Sloan fellow in 1997 and was an invited speaker at the 2014 ICM in Seoul where he gave a talk entitled "Completed cohomology and the p-adic Langlands program".

== Social media ==
Emerton formally ranked among the top 0.25% users of MathOverflow, where he used to be a frequent contributor, known for his expository pieces on the Langlands program, his posts on algebraic geometry, and his posts on number theory. He has also been noted for his helpful comments on math blogs.
