= Lucien Szpiro =

French mathematician (1941–2020)

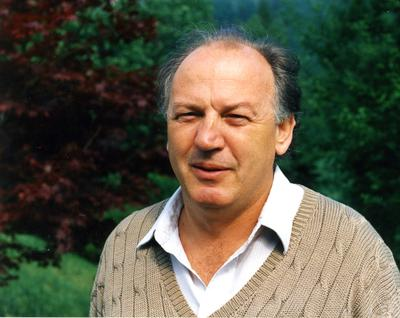
- Szpiro at the Mathematical Research Institute of Oberwolfach
- Born: 23 December 1941; Paris, France
- Died: 18 April 2020 (aged 78); Paris, France
- Education: Paris-Sud University
- Known for: Szpiro's conjecture
- Awards: Prix Doistau–Blutel (1987); Fellow of the American Mathematical Society (2012); Member of the Academia Europaea
- Scientific career
- Fields: Mathematics
- Workplaces: CUNY Graduate Center; French National Centre for Scientific Research
- Doctoral advisor: Pierre Samuel
- Doctoral students: Ahmed Abbes; Emmanuel Ullmo; Shou-Wu Zhang

Lucien Szpiro (23 December 1941 – 18 April 2020) was a French mathematician known for his work in number theory, arithmetic geometry, and commutative algebra. He formulated Szpiro's conjecture and was a distinguished professor at the CUNY Graduate Center and an emeritus Director of Research at the French National Centre for Scientific Research.

== Early life and education ==
Lucien Szpiro was born on 23 December 1941 in Paris, France. Szpiro attended Paris-Sud University where he earned his Doctor of Philosophy under Pierre Samuel. His doctoral work was heavily influenced by the seminars of Maurice Auslander, Claude Chevalley, and Alexander Grothendieck. He earned his Doctorat d'État (DrE) in 1971.

== Career ==
From 1963 to 1965, Szpiro worked as an assistant high school teacher in Paris. From 1965 to 1969, he was an assistant professor (maître assistant) at the University of Paris. From 1969 to 1999, Szpiro worked at the CNRS, initially as an attaché at Paris Diderot University before rising to the rank of a distinguished professor (Directeur de Recherche de Classe Exceptionnelle) at Paris-Sud University. In 1999, he became an emeritus professor (Directeur de Recherche émérite) at the CNRS and moved to the CUNY Graduate Center as a distinguished professor. He also held visiting positions at several institutions including Columbia University and the Institute for Advanced Study.

Szpiro was the editor-in-chief of Astérisque from 1991 to 1993 and an editor of the Bulletin de la Société Mathématique de France from 1984 to 1990. He was also head of the commission that oversaw the Société mathématique de France libraries.

Szpiro advised 17 doctoral students, including Ahmed Abbes, Emmanuel Ullmo, and Shou-Wu Zhang.

== Research ==
In the 1970s, Szpiro's research in commutative algebra led to his proof of the Auslander zero divisor conjecture. Together with Christian Peskine, he developed the liaison theory of algebraic varieties.

In the 1980s, Szpiro's research interests shifted to Diophantine geometry, first over function fields and then over number fields. The Institut des hautes études scientifiques described Szpiro as being "the first to realise the importance of a paper by Arakelov for questions of Diophantine geometry", which ultimately led to the development of Arakelov theory as a tool of modern Diophantine geometry exemplified by Gerd Faltings's proof of the Mordell conjecture. Szpiro also showed the link between the positivity of the dualising sheaf of a curve and the Bogomolov conjecture.

In 1981, Szpiro formulated a conjecture (now known as Szpiro's conjecture) relating the discriminant of an elliptic curve with its conductor. His conjecture inspired the abc conjecture, which was later shown to be equivalent to a modified form of Szpiro's conjecture in 1988. Szpiro's conjecture and its equivalent forms have been described as "the most important unsolved problem in Diophantine analysis" by Dorian Goldfeld, in part to its large number of consequences in number theory including Roth's theorem, the Mordell conjecture, the Fermat–Catalan conjecture, and Brocard's problem.

After moving to the CUNY Graduate Center in 1999, Szpiro began working on new research in arithmetic dynamics.

== Awards ==
In 1987, Szpiro received the Prix Doistau–Blutel from the French Academy of Sciences "for his work in Commutative Algebra and Algebraic Geometry and for his contribution to G. Faltings’ proof of the Mordell conjecture." In 2012 he became a fellow of the American Mathematical Society. He was a Member of the Academia Europaea.

== Death ==
Szpiro died on 18 April 2020 in Paris, France, from cardiac arrest.

== Selected publications ==
- Pesenti, Jerome; Szpiro, Lucien (2000). "Inégalité du discriminant pour les pinceaux elliptiques à réductions quelconques". Compositio Mathematica. 120 (1): 83–117. doi:10.1023/A:1001736823128.
- Peskine, Christian; Szpiro, Lucien (1973). "Dimension projective finie et cohomologie locale: Applications à la démonstration de conjectures de M. Auslander, H. Bass et A. Grothendieck". Publications Mathématiques de l'IHÉS (in French). 42 (1): 47–119. doi:10.1007/BF02685877. ISSN 0073-8301. S2CID 124116905.
- Peskine, Christian; Szpiro, Lucien (1974). "Liaison des variétés algébriques I". Inventiones Mathematicae (in French). 26 (4): 271–302. Bibcode:1974InMat..26..271P. doi:10.1007/BF01425554. ISSN 0020-9910. S2CID 123364655.
- Szpiro, Lucien; Ullmo, Emmanuel; Zhang, Shou-Wu (1997). "Equirépartition des petits points". Inventiones Mathematicae (in French). 127 (2): 337–347. Bibcode:1997InMat.127..337S. doi:10.1007/s002220050123. S2CID 119668209.
- Szpiro, Lucien (1979). "Sur le théorème de rigidité de Parsin et Arakelov". Astérisque. Journées de géométrie algébrique de Rennes - (Juillet 1978) (II) : Groupes formels, représentations galoisiennes et cohomologie des variétés de caractéristique positive. 64: 169–202. MR 0563470.
- Szpiro, Lucien (1981). "Seminaire sur les pinceaux des courbes de genre au moins deux". Astérisque. 86 (3): 44–78. Zbl 0463.00009.
- Szpiro, Lucien (1987). "Présentation de la théorie d'Arakelov". In Ribet, Kenneth A. (ed.). Current Trends in Arithmetical Algebraic Geometry. Contemporary Mathematics. Vol. 67. pp. 279–293. doi:10.1090/conm/067/902599. ISBN 9780821850749. Zbl 0634.14012.
- Szpiro, Lucien. Conjecture de Mordell, Séminaire Nicolas Bourbaki 1983/4.
