= Neron =

Neron or Néron may refer to:

- Neron (character), a fictional character in the DC Comics' universe.
- An alternative name of the Roman Emperor Nero
- André Néron, a mathematician, who introduced:
  - Néron minimal model
  - Néron differential
  - Néron–Severi group
  - Néron–Ogg–Shafarevich criterion
  - Néron–Tate height
- Geneviève Néron, a Canadian actress and musician
- Néron, Eure-et-Loir, a commune in the Eure-et-Loir department of France
- Néron (Isère), a mountain in France near the city of Grenoble
- Néron, a village in the commune of Amanlis in the Ille-et-Vilaine department of France, located in the region of Brittany
- NOAA's Environmental Real-time Observation Network (NERON), the US Weather Observation Network
- Néron (opera) by Anton Rubinstein

== See also ==
- Nero (disambiguation)
- Nerone (disambiguation)
