= Conductor =

Conductor or conduction may refer to:

== Arts and entertainment ==
- Conductor (music), a person who leads a musical ensemble
- Conductor (album), by The Comas, 2004
- Conductor Williams (Denzel Williams, born 1982), American music producer
- Conduction, the musical improvisation method of Butch Morris
- The Conductor (film), by Pavel Lungin, Russia, 2012
- The Orchestra Conductor, or The Conductor, a 1980 Polish drama film
- Mr. Conductor, a character in Shining Time Station

== Science and technology ==
=== Biology and medicine ===
- Bone conduction, the conduction of sound to the inner ear
- Conduction aphasia, an acquired language disorder
- Part of the palpal bulb of male spiders

=== Mathematics ===
- Conductor (ring theory)
- Conductor of an abelian variety
- Conductor of a Dirichlet character
- Conductor (class field theory)
- Artin conductor, of a Galois group
- Conductor of a Numerical semigroup

=== Physics ===
- Electrical conductor
  - Fast ion conductor
  - Mixed conductor, ionic and electronic
- Cardiac conduction system, of the heart
- Thermal conduction

== Transportation ==
- Bus conductor
- Conductor (train crew)

== Other uses ==
- Conductor (architecture), a downspout
- Conductor (company), an American enterprise software provider
- Conductor (military appointment), an appointment held by selected warrant officers in the British Army
- Conductor (software), a microservice and workflow orchestration software platform
- Conductor (underground railroad), a guide on the secret routes for fugitive slaves in the United States
- Conductor, a term in conductive education

== See also ==
- Conducător, title used officially by Romanian dictator Ion Antonescu during World War II
- Electrical resistivity and conductivity
- Electrical resistance and conductance
- Thermal conductivity and resistivity
