= Arithmetic of abelian varieties =

Concept in number theory (mathematics)

In mathematics, the arithmetic of abelian varieties is the study of the number theory of an abelian variety, or a family of abelian varieties. It goes back to the studies of Pierre de Fermat on what are now recognized as elliptic curves; and has become a very substantial area of arithmetic geometry both in terms of results and conjectures. Most of these can be posed for an abelian variety A over a number field K; or more generally (for global fields or more general finitely-generated rings or fields).

== Integer points on abelian varieties ==
There is some tension here between concepts: integer point belongs in a sense to affine geometry, while abelian variety is inherently defined in projective geometry. The basic results, such as Siegel's theorem on integral points, come from the theory of diophantine approximation.

== Rational points on abelian varieties ==
The basic result, the Mordell–Weil theorem in Diophantine geometry, says that A(K), the group of points on A over K, is a finitely-generated abelian group. A great deal of information about its possible torsion subgroups is known, at least when A is an elliptic curve. The question of the rank is thought to be bound up with L-functions (see below).

The torsor theory here leads to the Selmer group and Tate–Shafarevich group, the latter (conjecturally finite) being difficult to study.

== Heights ==
The theory of heights plays a prominent role in the arithmetic of abelian varieties. For instance, the canonical Néron–Tate height is a quadratic form with remarkable properties that appear in the statement of the Birch and Swinnerton-Dyer conjecture.

== Reduction mod p ==
Reduction of an abelian variety A modulo a prime ideal of (the integers of) K — say, a prime number p — to get an abelian variety A_{p} over a finite field, is possible for almost all p. The 'bad' primes, for which the reduction degenerates by acquiring singular points, are known to reveal very interesting information. As often happens in number theory, the 'bad' primes play a rather active role in the theory.

Here a refined theory of (in effect) a right adjoint to reduction mod p — the Néron model — cannot always be avoided. In the case of an elliptic curve there is an algorithm of John Tate describing it.

== L-functions ==
For abelian varieties such as A_{p}, there is a definition of local zeta-function available. To get an L-function for A itself, one takes a suitable Euler product of such local functions; to understand the finite number of factors for the 'bad' primes one has to refer to the Tate module of A, which is (dual to) the étale cohomology group H^{1}(A), and the Galois group action on it. In this way one gets a respectable definition of Hasse–Weil L-function for A. In general its properties, such as functional equation, are still conjectural – the Taniyama–Shimura conjecture (which was proven in 2001) was just a special case, so that's hardly surprising.

It is in terms of this L-function that the conjecture of Birch and Swinnerton-Dyer is posed. It is just one particularly interesting aspect of the general theory about values of L-functions L(s) at integer values of s, and there is much empirical evidence supporting it.

== Complex multiplication ==
Since the time of Carl Friedrich Gauss (who knew of the lemniscate function case) the special role has been known of those abelian varieties $A$ with extra automorphisms, and more generally endomorphisms. In terms of the ring ${\rm End}(A)$, there is a definition of abelian variety of CM-type that singles out the richest class. These are special in their arithmetic. This is seen in their L-functions in rather favourable terms – the harmonic analysis required is all of the Pontryagin duality type, rather than needing more general automorphic representations. That reflects a good understanding of their Tate modules as Galois modules. It also makes them harder to deal with in terms of the conjectural algebraic geometry (Hodge conjecture and Tate conjecture). In those problems the special situation is more demanding than the general.

In the case of elliptic curves, the Kronecker Jugendtraum was the programme Leopold Kronecker proposed, to use elliptic curves of CM-type to do class field theory explicitly for imaginary quadratic fields – in the way that roots of unity allow one to do this for the field of rational numbers. This generalises, but in some sense with loss of explicit information (as is typical of several complex variables).

== Manin–Mumford conjecture ==
The Manin–Mumford conjecture of Yuri Manin and David Mumford, proved by Michel Raynaud, states that a curve C in its Jacobian variety J can only contain a finite number of points that are of finite order (a torsion point) in J, unless C = J. There are other more general versions, such as the Bogomolov conjecture which generalizes the statement to non-torsion points.
