= Bogomolov conjecture =

In mathematics, the Bogomolov conjecture is a conjecture, named after Fedor Bogomolov, in arithmetic geometry about algebraic curves that generalizes the Manin–Mumford conjecture in arithmetic geometry.

The conjecture was proven by Emmanuel Ullmo in 1998 and was subsequently generalized by Shou-Wu Zhang to subvarieties of general abelian varieties in 1998. Both Ullmo's and Zhang's proofs rely on Arakelov theory. The idea of using Arakelov theory to attack the Bogomolov conjecture is due to Lucien Szpiro.

In recent years, generalizations and variants of the Bogomolov conjecture have become a central area of research in both arithmetic dynamics and diophantine geometry, motivating many developments in both fields.

== Manin–Mumford conjecture ==
The Manin–Mumford conjecture concerns the finiteness of torsion points lying on an algebraic curve $C$ of genus $g \geq 2$, over a field $K$ of characteristic zero, when the curve is embedded into its Jacobian variety. The conjecture was independently formulated by Yuri Manin and David Mumford, and was inspired by André Weil's approach to the Mordell's conjecture (also known as Faltings' theorem).

More generally, in the spirit of the Bombieri–Lang conjecture, one may ask when does an irreducible subvariety $V$ of an abelian variety $A$ have a Zariski dense set of torsion points. The Manin–Mumford conjecture asserts that this occurs if and only if $V$ is a torsion coset, that is, $V$ is of the form $x+B$ where $B$ is an abelian subvariety of $A$ and $x$ a torsion point of $A$.

The Manin–Mumford conjecture, both for curves embedded in Jacobians and for general subvarieties of abelian varieties, was proven by Michel Raynaud. Alternative proofs and further generalizations were later obtained by Jean-Pierre Serre, Marc Hindry and Robert Coleman.

When $K$ is of characteristic $p$, additional assumptions on $A$ are needed for the Manin–Mumford conjecture to hold because of the presence of the Frobenius endomorphism. Special cases were proven by Dan Abramovich and José Felipe Voloch. Using ideas from model theory, Ehud Hrushovski later proved a general version for the prime-to-$p$ torsion group. This was subsequently extended by Richard Pink and Damian Rössler to the full torsion group.

The Manin–Mumford conjecture can be viewed as a special case of the Zilber–Pink conjecture. The Zilber–Pink conjecture remains widely open.

== Bogomolov conjecture ==
The Bogomolov conjecture generalizes the Manin–Mumford conjecture by replacing torsion points with points of small Néron–Tate height. More precisely, let $C$ be a curve of genus $g \geq 2$ that is defined over a number field $K$. Let $L$ be a symmetric ample line bundle for the Jacobian $J$ and let $\widehat{h}$ denote the associated Néron–Tate height on $J$. The Bogomolov conjecture predicts there exists $\epsilon > 0$ such that the set

$\{ x \in C(\overline{K}) : \widehat{h}(x) < \epsilon\}$

is finite. Since $\widehat{h}(x) = 0$ if and only if $x$ is a torsion point, this recovers the Manin–Mumford conjecture as a special case. Heuristically, points of small Néron–Tate height may be viewed as arithmetic analogues of points lying "close" to torsion points. From this perspective, the Bogomolov conjecture predicts that the finiteness phenomenon of Manin–Mumford persists even after replacing each torsion point by a small arithmetic neighborhood.

Much like the Manin–Mumford conjecture, the Bogomolov conjecture extends naturally to arbitrary subvarieties $V \subseteq A$ of an abelian variety. In this more general setting, the conjecture predicts that if $V$ is not a torsion coset, then there exists $\epsilon>0$ such that

$\{ x \in V(\overline{K}) : \widehat{h}(x) < \epsilon\}$

is not Zariski dense in $V$.

The Bogomolov conjecture for curves embedded in their Jacobians was proven by Ullmo using equidistribution of Galois orbits of points with small Néron–Tate height towards the Haar measure of the abelian variety. This equidistribution phenomenon was established by Lucien Szpiro, Ullmo and Zhang through methods of Arakelov theory, using the arithmetic Riemann–Roch theorem developed by Henri Gillet and Christophe Soulé. The general case of subvarieties of abelian varieties was proven by Zhang using equidistribution too.

An alternative proof of the Bogomolov conjecture for subvarieties was obtained by Sinnou David and Patrice Philippon using techniques from diophantine approximation and transcendental number theory. Their approach is quantitative in nature, yielding an explicit $\epsilon > 0$ together with an upper bound for the degree of a subvariety containing all points of height at most $\epsilon$.

== Geometric Bogomolov conjecture ==
As the Néron–Tate height can be defined over any field $K$ that has a Weil height function, the Bogomolov conjecture admits a natural extension to more general fields. When $K$ is the function field of an algebraic variety, this statement is known as the geometric Bogomolov conjecture. Building on earlier work of Zhang, Atsushi Moriwaki, Kazuhiko Yamaki and Xander Faber prove the conjecture for low genus curves embedded in their Jacobians using potential theory on graphs. The general case was settled by Zubeyir Cinkir.

For higher dimensional subvarieties over function fields $K$, Zhang's approach is difficult to carry over due to the lack of an archimedean place. To overcome this, Antoine Chambert-Loir introduced canonical measures on Berkovich spaces as non-archimedean analogues of the measures appearing in Szpiro–Ullmo–Zhang's equidistribution theorem. In a series of works, Walter Gubler proved that Galois orbits of small points do equidistribute to this Chambert-Loir measure and studied its properties using tropical geometry, leading to a proof of the Bogomolov conjecture when $A$ has a place of totally degenerate reduction. The full geometric Bogomolov conjecture was resolved by Junyi Xie and Xinyi Yuan by reducing it to the Manin–Mumford conjecture. Their proof uses a reduction argument due to Yamaki to the case where $A$ has everywhere good reduction.

When $K$ is the function field of a curve with characteristic zero, Ziyang Gao and Philipp Habegger gave an alternative proof using methods from o-minimality. This was extended to general characteristic zero function fields by Serge Cantat, Gao, Habegger and Xie, where they replace the o-minimality arguments with ergodic theory.

For arithmetic function fields, the Bogomolov conjecture was proven by Moriwaki.

== Uniform variants ==
The uniform Manin–Mumford conjecture for curves embedded in their Jacobians, proposed by Barry Mazur, predicts the existence of a constant $N = N(g)> 0$, depending only on the genus $g$ of our algebraic curve $C$, such that $C$ contains at most $N$ torsion points of its Jacobian.

Analogously, one may formulate a uniform Bogomolov conjecture: there should exists constants $\epsilon = \epsilon(g) > 0$ and $N = N(g) > 0$, depending only on $g$ and not on the curve $C$ or number field $K$, such that the set

$\{ x \in C(\overline{K}) : \widehat{h}(x) < \epsilon\}$

contains at most $N$ points.

Special cases of the uniform Bogomolov conjecture were established by David and Phillipon, and later by Laura DeMarco, Holly Krieger and Hexi Ye. David and Phillipon further conjectured that the constant $\epsilon$ may be replaced with $\epsilon \max\{h_{\mathrm{Fal}}(C),1\}$, where $h_{\mathrm{Fal}}(C)$ denotes the Faltings height of $C$.

When $h_{\mathrm{Fal}}(C)$ is sufficiently large, Vesselin Dimitrov, Gao and Habegger proved this strengthened form by studying the non-degeneracy of families of curves. Combined with Gaël Remond's quantitative refinement of Vojta's inequality, their work implies the existence of a constant $c = c(g,K) > 0$, depending on the genus $g$ and the number field $K$ that the size of $C(K)$ is bounded by $c^{\mathrm{rk}\,J(K) + 1}$, where $\mathrm{rk}$ $J(K)$ denotes the rank of the Mordell–Weil group of $J(K)$. This yields a uniform version of the Mordell conjecture and a proof of Mazur's conjecture B.

The full uniform Bogomolov conjecture for curves in their Jacobians was proven by Lars Kühne, building on the work of Dimitrov, Gao and Habegger. Subsequently, Tangli Ge, Gao and Kühne proved the uniform Bogomolov conjecture for higher dimensional subvarieties. An alternative proof in the case of curves in Jacobians was given by Yuan, based on the theory of adelic line bundles over quasi-projective varieties by Yuan and Zhang.

Over function fields, a quantitative form of the uniform Bogomolov conjecture for curves in Jacobians was proven by Nicole Looper, Joseph Silverman and Robert Wilms. Over number fields, Yuan, Jiawei Yu and Shengxuan Zhou established a quantitative version for curves in Jacobians, which yields a quantitative version of the uniform Mordell conjecture.

== Dynamical Variants ==
Motivated by Silverman's dictionary between arithmetic dynamics and diophantine geometry, Zhang proposed a dynamical generalization of the Manin–Mumford conjecture, known as the dynamical Manin–Mumford conjecture. Let $f: X \to X$ be an endomorphism of a projective variety that is polarizable, which is to say there exists an ample line bundle $L$ and $d > 1$ such that $f^* L \simeq L^{\otimes d}$. Then the conjecture asserts that if $V \subseteq X$ is a subvariety containing a Zariski dense set of preperiodic points, then $V$ itself is preperiodic.

This formulation of the dynamical Manin–Mumford conjecture turned out to be false, with counterexamples coming from elliptic curves with complex multiplication. Dragos Ghioca, Thomas Tucker and Zhang fixed the conjecture by weakening the conclusion that $V$ is preperiodic.

One can also formulate a dynamical Bogomolov conjecture by replacing the Néron–Tate height with the Call–Silverman canonical height.

For $X = (\mathbb{P}^1)^n$ and $f$ a split endomorphism, the dynamical Manin–Mumford and Bogomolov conjectures were proven by Dragos Ghioca, Dang-Khoa Nguyen and Hexi Ye. Both conjectures remain wide open for $X = \mathbb{P}^n$ where $n \geq 2$. Special cases were proven by Romain Dujardin and Charles Favre, and by Dujardin, Favre and Matteo Ruggiero.

Uniform versions were proven by DeMarco, Krieger and Ye for the case of $X = (\mathbb{P}^1)^2, V = \Delta$ is the diagonal, and $(f,g)$ belonging to either the family of Legendre Lattès maps or quadratic unicritical polynomials. The case of general Lattès maps was settled later by Jérôme Poineau, which settled the Bogomolov–Fu–Tschinkel conjecture. Uniformity in one parameter families for $X = (\mathbb{P}^1)^2$ and $V_t$ any one-parameter family of curves was proven by Niki Myrto Mavraki and Harry Schmidt.
