= Ahmed Abbes =

Tunisian-French mathematician (born 1970)

- Born: 24 May 1970 (age 56); Sfax, Tunisia
- Citizenship: Tunisian; French
- Education: Paris-Sud University; École Normale Supérieure
- Awards: CNRS Bronze Medal (2005); Corresponding member of the Tunisian Academy of Sciences, Letters, and Arts
- Scientific career
- Fields: Mathematics
- Institutions: French National Centre for Scientific Research; Institut des Hautes Études Scientifiques; University of Rennes 1; Paris-Sud University
- Thesis: Théorie d'Arakelov et courbes modulaires (1995)
- Doctoral advisor: Lucien Szpiro

Ahmed Abbes (born 24 May 1970) is a Tunisian-French mathematician and a Director of research at the CNRS at the Institut des Hautes Études Scientifiques (IHÉS). He is known for his work in arithmetic geometry.

== Early life and education ==
Abbes was born on 24 May 1970 in Sfax, Tunisia. Abbes received a bronze medal in 1988 and a silver medal in 1989 at the International Mathematical Olympiad while representing Tunisia. Abbes has both French and Tunisian citizenship.

Abbes studied at the École Normale Supérieure from 1990 to 1994 and then received his doctorate from Paris-Sud University in 1995 under the supervision of Lucien Szpiro, with the thesis Théorie d'Arakelov et courbes modulaires on Arakelov theory and modular curves. At Paris-Sud, Michel Raynaud was one of his mentors. Abbes received his habilitation in 2003.

== Career ==
Abbes was a post-doctoral researcher at the Institut des Hautes Études Scientifiques (IHÉS) from 1995 to 1996 and was also a post-doctoral researcher at the Max Planck Institute for Mathematics in 1996. From 1996 to 2007, he was a Chargé de recherche at the CNRS at Paris-Sud University. From 2007 to 2011, he was a CNRS Director of Research (2nd class) at the University of Rennes 1. In 2011, he moved to the IHÉS where he was a CNRS Director of Research (2nd class) until 2013 and where he has been a CNRS Director of Research (1st class) since 2013.

Abbes was an editor for Astérisque from 2010 to 2018 and is the co-editor-in-chief of the Tunisian Journal of Mathematics.

Abbes is a Coordinator of the Tunisian Campaign for the Academic and Cultural Boycott of Israel (TACBI). He is also a Secretary of the French Association of Academics for Respect for International Law in Palestine (AURDIP).

== Research ==
Abbes's research concerns the geometric and cohomological properties of sheaves on manifolds over perfect fields of positive characteristic and p-adic fields. He has worked on a p-adic Simpson correspondence and other topics in p-adic Hodge theory with Michel Gros.

== Awards ==
In 2005, Abbes was awarded the CNRS Bronze Medal. He is a corresponding member of the Tunisian Academy of Sciences, Letters, and Arts.
