= Nero (disambiguation) =

Nero (37–68 AD) was the Roman emperor from 54 to 68 AD.

Nero may also refer to:

== People ==
- Any male member of the Claudii Nerones family of gens Claudia may be called Nero to distinguish them from other clan members
- Nero Julius Caesar (6–31 AD), related to some emperors
- Gaius Claudius Nero, Roman consul and hero of the Battle of the Metaurus in 207 BC
- Nero Hawley (1742–1817), freed slave and soldier in the Continental Army
- Franco Nero (born 1941), Italian actor
- Peter Nero (1934–2023), American pianist and composer
- Nero Bellum, lead singer of the musical group Psyclon Nine
- Ranjith Premasiri Madalana (died 2009), alias Nero, decorated Sri Lanka Army sniper

== Places ==
- Nero, Kentucky, United States
- Nero, Mozambique
- Nero, West Virginia, United States
- Nero Island, an uninhabited island in Qikiqtaaluk Region, Nunavut, Canada
- Lake Nero, in Yaroslavl Oblast, Russia
- Lake Nero, in Cesana Torinese, Turin
- Nero, the German name for Nerău village, Teremia Mare Commune, Timiș County, Romania

== Art, entertainment, and media ==
=== Comics ===
- The Adventures of Nero, a Belgian comics series
- Nero and Zero, a British comic strip

=== Characters ===
- Nero (comic book character), the protagonist in the Flemish comic book character The Adventures of Nero
- Nero (Devil May Cry), a character in the video game series Devil May Cry
- Nero Wolfe, a fictional detective
- A character in the British 1930s comic strip Nero and Zero
- Alex Nero, a supervillain opponent of the Green Lantern
- Barone Nero, a character from Ressha Sentai ToQger
- Angelica Nero, a character in season 9 of Dallas
- Nero, a character in Boktai 2: Solar Boy Django
- Nero, a character from the manga One Piece
- Nero, a character in the British children's series 4 O'Clock Club
- Nero the Sable, member of the fictional Tsviets of Deepground in Dirge of Cerberus: Final Fantasy VII
- Nero, a minor villain in the British cartoon series Danger Mouse
- Nero, a Servant of the Saber class in Fate/Extra, Fate/Extella and Fate/Grand Order video games
- Nero, a character in Derek Landy's book Bedlam, book 12 in the Skulduggery Pleasant series
- Nero, a Romulan captain from the 2009 Star Trek film
- Nero Padilla, a main character on the television series Sons of Anarchy
- Vice-Principal Nero, a character from Lemony Snicket's A Series of Unfortunate Events

=== Film ===
- Nero-Film, a German film production company of the Weimar era
- Nero (1909 film), an Italian film directed by Luigi Maggi and Arturo Ambrosio
- Nero (1922 film), an American-Italian historical film directed by J. Gordon Edwards
- Nero (1992 film), an Italian crime comedy film written and directed by Giancarlo Soldi
- Nero (2004 film), a television film

=== Games ===
- New England Role-playing Organization, a live action role-playing game
- National Emergency Response Organization, a fictional institution in the game Days Gone

=== Music ===
- Nero (band), an electronic music trio composed of Daniel Stephens, Joe Ray, and Alana Watson
- Nero, a 1705 opera by George Frideric Handel, HWV 2
- Nero (opera), an 1879 grand opera by Anton Rubinstein to a libretto by Jules Barbier
- Nero (Closterkeller album), 2003
- Nero (Two Steps from Hell album), or the title song
- "Nero" (song), a 2023 single by Godflesh
- "Nero", a 1981 single by post-punk band Theatre of Hate
- "Nero the Second", an Anglo-Irish Jacobite song of the 18th century
- "Black Cat" (aka Nero), a song by the South Korean group Turbo

== Software ==
- Nero AG, German software company (formerly known as Ahead Software), and its products:
  - Nero Burning ROM, CD/DVD authoring application
  - Nero Digital, suite of MPEG-4-compatible audio and video compression codecs
  - Nero Multimedia Suite, a suite of CD/DVD authoring tools and digital entertainment products that includes Nero Burning ROM, among other software
- Neuro-Evolving Robotic Operatives, a video game in which soldiers are evolved with the neuroevolution of augmenting topologies algorithm

== Other uses ==
- Nero (confectionery), a Norwegian liquorice-based dark chocolate confection
- Nero (yacht), one of the world's largest luxury yachts
- Nero d'Avola, Sicilian red wine grape variety
- Nero Decree, a 1945 decree of Adolf Hitler
- Caffè Nero, a chain of coffee houses

== See also ==
- Niro (disambiguation)
- Neron (disambiguation)
- Nerone (disambiguation)
- Nervo (disambiguation)
