= Francis Brown (mathematician) =

English-French mathematician

- Born: 5 November 1977 (age 48)
- Education: Eton College; University of Cambridge; École normale supérieure (Paris) / University of Bordeaux
- Awards: Élie Cartan Prize
- Scientific career
- Fields: Mathematics
- Institutions: All Souls College, Oxford
- Academic advisors: Pierre Cartier
- Website: https://www.asc.ox.ac.uk/person/professor-francis-brown

Francis Brown is a Franco-British mathematician who works on arithmetic geometry and quantum field theory.

== Career ==
Brown studied at the University of Cambridge and the École normale supérieure (Paris) and University of Bordeaux, with Pierre Cartier, graduating in 2006 with a Ph.D. He then spent time at the Max Planck Institute for Mathematics and Mittag-Leffler Institute. In 2007 he moved to Institut de mathématiques de Jussieu – Paris Rive Gauche where he won a European Research Council starter grant in 2010. In 2012, he moved to the Institut des Hautes Études Scientifiques and was awarded a CNRS Bronze Medal and Élie Cartan Prize for his proof of two conjectures related to multiple zeta functions. He had a Von Neumann Fellowship at the Institute for Advanced Study from 2014 to 2015 and is currently a senior research fellow at All Souls College, at the University of Oxford.

Brown's work is on the intersection of algebraic geometry and number theory. He has published on Tate Motives. He also works on Zeta functions in quantum field theory.

He was elected a Fellow of the Royal Society in 2026.

== Selected publications ==
- Multiple zeta values and periods of moduli spaces ${\mathfrak M}_{0,n}$. Ann. Sci. Éc. Norm. Supér. (4) 42 (2009), no. 3, 371–489. ArXiv
- Mixed Tate motives over $\Z$. Ann. of Math. (2) 175 (2012), no. 2, 949–976. ArXiv
- Dedekind zeta motives for totally real number fields. Invent. Math. 194 (2013), no. 2, 257–311. ArXiv
- Motivic periods and $P^1\setminus\left\{0,1,\infty\right\}$. Proceedings of the ICM 2014. online
