= Anna Erschler =

Russian mathematician (born 1977)

Anna Gennadievna Erschler, née Dyubina (Анна Геннадьевна Эршлер; born 14 February 1977), is a Russian mathematician working in France. She specializes in geometric group theory and probability theory, in particular, random walks on groups.

== Education and career ==
Beginning in 1994, Erschler studied mathematics at Saint Petersburg State University, receiving her M.Sc. in 1999 and then studying in the academic year 1999–2000 at Tel Aviv University. In 2001, she received her Ph.D. from Saint Petersburg State University under the direction of Anatoly Vershik, with a thesis titled Geometric und probabilistic properties of wreath products. In October 2012, she received her habilitation (Thèse d'État) from the University of Paris 11.

She was a postdoc in the academic year 2001–2002 at the Steklov Institute in Saint Petersburg and in the academic year 2002–2003 at the Institut des Hautes Études Scientifiques in Paris and at IRMAR in Rennes. From October 2003 to December 2005, she was Chargée de recherche at the Centre national de la recherche scientifique, University of Lille. At CNRS, University Paris 11, she was from January 2006 to September 2013 Chargée de recherché, and then from October 2013 to April 2013, Directrice de recherche. From May 2014, she has been Directrice de recherche at CNRS, DMA/ENS, Orsay.

She is a co-editor of the journal Groups, Geometry and Dynamics.

== Work ==
In an early work, Erschler proved that all asymptotic cones of a hyperbolic space are real trees, and that this property characterises hyperbolic spaces. She also did groundbreaking work on the drift of a random walk in finitely generated groups, namely estimating at what distance from the identity will a particule walking randomly on the Cayley graph of a group be after $n$ steps, giving new examples with unexpected behaviors.

== Recognition ==
Erschler received in 2001 the Möbius Prize of the Independent University of Moscow and in 2002 the Annual Prize of the Saint Petersburg Mathematical Society. In 2010, she was an invited speaker at the International Congress of Mathematicians in Hyderabad, where she gave a talk on Poisson–Furstenberg boundaries, large-scale geometry and growth of groups. In the summer of 2010 at the University of Göttingen she was the ninth Emmy Noether visiting professor, lecturing on random walks and Poisson–Furstenberg boundaries. In 2015, she received the Élie Cartan Prize of the French Academy of Sciences. In 2020, she won the CNRS Silver Medal.

== Selected publications ==
- Anna Erschler, Tianyi Zheng. Growth of periodic Grigorchuk groups. Inventiones Mathematicae, vol. 219 (2020), no.3, pp 1069–1155.
- Anna Erschler. Critical constants for recurrence of random walks on G-spaces. // Université de Grenoble. Annales de l'Institut Fourier, vol. 55 (2005), no. 2, pp. 493–509.
- Erschler, Anna (2004). "Boundary behaviour for groups of subexponential growth". Annals of Mathematics. 160 (3): 1183–1210. doi:10.4007/annals.2004.160.1183. JSTOR 3597336.
- Erschler-Dyubina, Anna (2002). "On the geometry of infinite cyclic subgroups". Israel Journal of Mathematics. 132: 373–380. doi:10.1007/BF02784522.
