= Jean-Louis Colliot-Thélène =

French mathematician

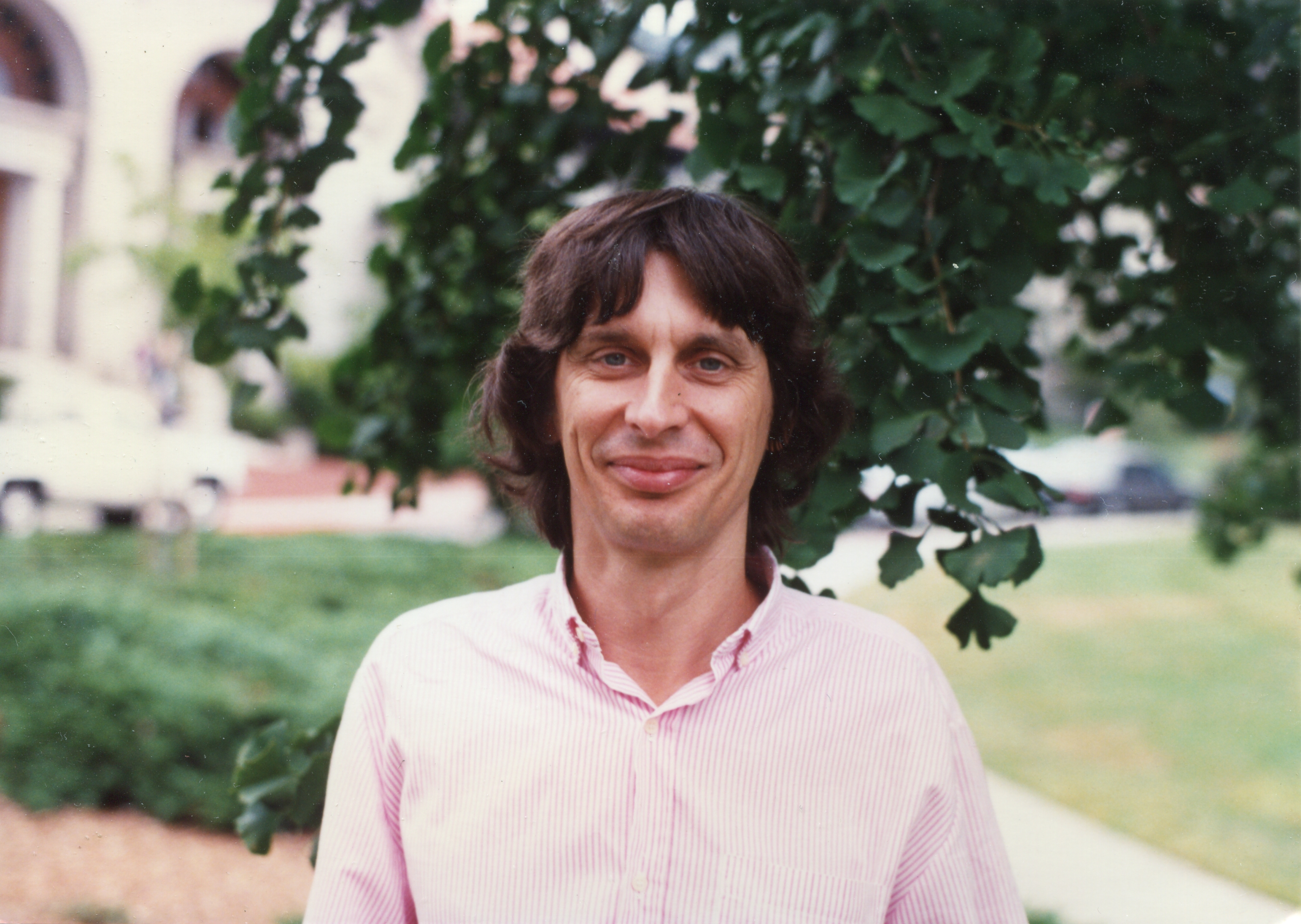
- Jean-Louis Colliot-Thélène in Berkeley, 1989
- Born: 2 December 1947 (age 78); Quimper (Finistère), France
- Education: École Normale Supérieure; Université Paris-Saclay
- Awards: Fermat Prize (1991)
- Scientific career
- Fields: Mathematics
- Workplaces: CNRS; Université Paris-Saclay
- Doctoral advisor: André Néron; Peter Swinnerton-Dyer

Jean-Louis Colliot-Thélène (French: [ʒɑ̃lwi kɔljɔ telɛn]; born 2 December 1947) is a French mathematician. He is a Directeur de Recherches at CNRS at the Université Paris-Saclay in Orsay. He studies mainly number theory and arithmetic geometry.

== Awards ==
- Prize of the French Academy of Sciences "Charles Louis de Saulces de Freycine" (1985)
- Invited Speaker to the International Congress of Mathematicians (Berkeley 1986)
- Fermat Prize for mathematical research (1991)
- Grand prize of the French Academy of Sciences "Léonid Frank" (2009)
- Fellow of the American Mathematical Society (2012)
