= Emmanuel Ullmo =

French mathematician

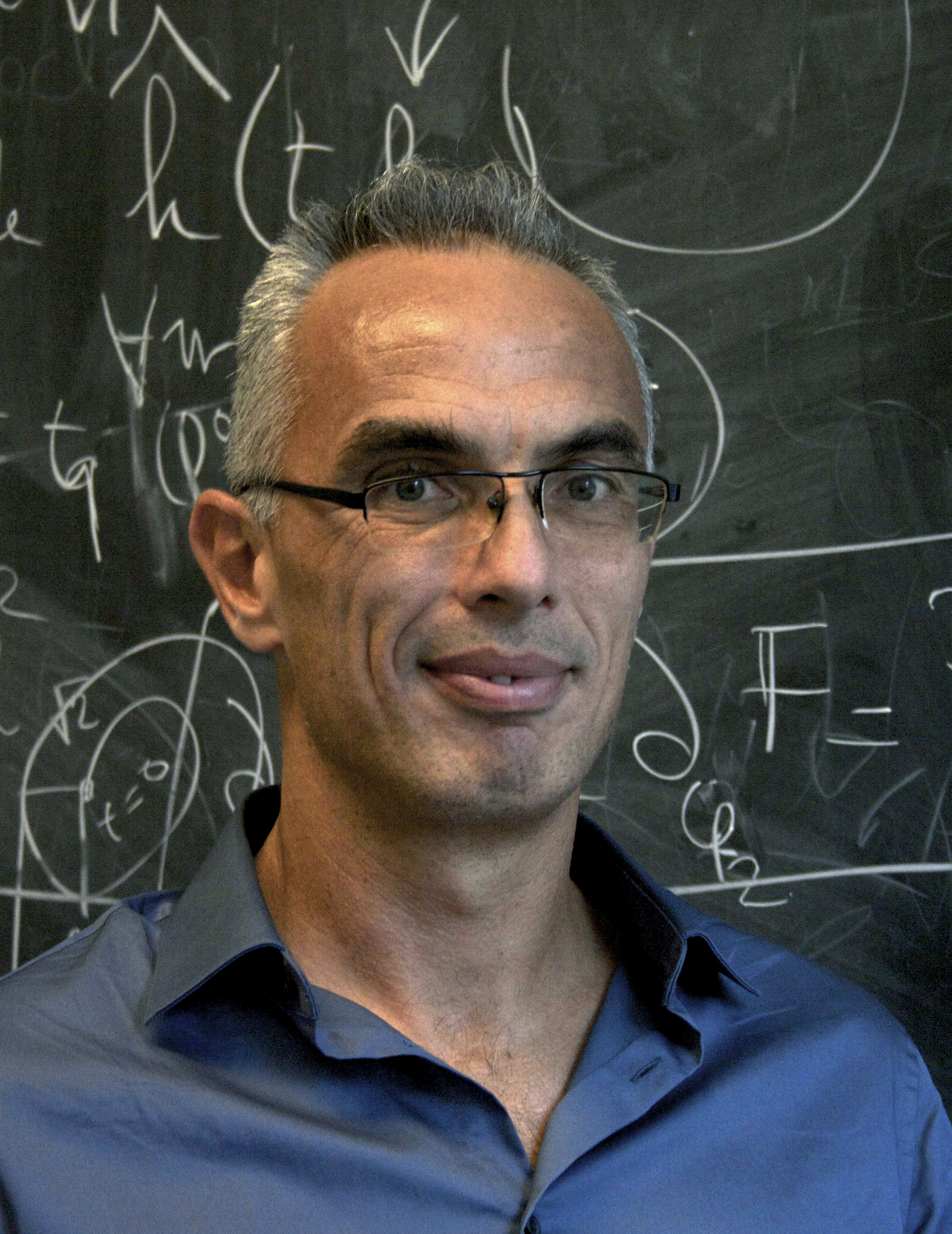
- Born: 25 June 1965 (age 61); Paris, France
- Education: University of Paris-Sud
- Awards: Élie Cartan Prize (2006)
- Scientific career
- Fields: Mathematics
- Workplaces: Université Paris-Sud; Institut des Hautes Études Scientifiques
- Doctoral advisor: Lucien Szpiro
- Doctoral students: Ziyang Gao

Emmanuel Ullmo (born 25 June 1965) is a French mathematician, specialised in arithmetic geometry. Since 2013 he has served as director of the Institut des Hautes Études scientifiques.

== Education ==
Ullmo wrote his thesis under Lucien Szpiro at the University of Paris-Sud in 1993.

== Career ==
Ullmo was appointed a professor at University of Paris-Sud in 2001. He also held temporary positions at IMPA for 18 months, then two years at Princeton University, and six months at Tsinghua University. In 2013, following the retirement of Jean-Pierre Bourguignon, he became the 5th director of the IHÉS.

He was an editor of the journal Inventiones mathematicae between 2007 and 2014.

== Research ==
The Bogomolov conjecture was proved by Ullmo and Shou-Wu Zhang using Arakelov theory in 1998.

== Awards and honors ==
He was an invited speaker at the International Congress of Mathematicians at Beijing in 2002. Between 2003 and 2008 he was a junior fellow at the Institut de France. He received the Élie Cartan Prize of the French Academy of Sciences in 2006 for his work on the proof of the Bogomolov conjecture with Shou-Wu Zhang.

In 2022, he became a chevalier (knight) of the Legion of Honour, an award that was bestowed upon him in September 2023 by Sylvie Retailleau.
