= Mordell–Weil group =

Abelian group

In arithmetic geometry, the Mordell–Weil group is an abelian group associated to any abelian variety $A$ defined over a number field $K$. It is an arithmetic invariant of the Abelian variety. It is simply the group of $K$-points of $A$, so $A(K)$ is the Mordell–Weil group^{pg 207}. The main structure theorem about this group is the Mordell–Weil theorem which shows this group is in fact a finitely-generated abelian group. Moreover, there are many conjectures related to this group, such as the Birch and Swinnerton-Dyer conjecture which relates the rank of $A(K)$ to the zero of the associated L-function at a special point.

== Examples ==
Computing the Mordell–Weil group of a specific abelian variety is a difficult and often infeasible task. We illustrate with the following elliptic curve over the rational numbers: $E/\mathbb{Q}$ defined by the Weierstrass equation

$$y^2 = x(x-6)(x+6).$$

It has discriminant $\Delta_E = 2^{12}\cdot 3^6$, and this polynomial can be used to define a global model $\mathcal{E}/\mathbb{Z}$. We can show that

$$E(\mathbb{Q}) \cong \mathbb{Z}/2\times \mathbb{Z}/2 \times \mathbb{Z}$$

through the following procedure. First, we find the following 4 torsion points by inspection:

$$\infty, (0,0), (6,0), (-6,0).$$

After trying some smaller pairs of integers, we find $(-3,9)$ is a point which is not obviously torsion. A useful result is that, for $E$ having good reduction to $p$, the torsion part of $E(\mathbb{Q})$ that is prime to $p$, denoted $E(\mathbb{Q})_{\mathrm{tors},p}$, injects into $E(\mathbb{F}_p)$. We check at two primes $p = 5,7$ and calculate the cardinality of the sets

$$\begin{align}
\# E(\mathbb{F}_5) &= 8 = 2^3 \\
\# E(\mathbb{F}_{7}) &= 12 = 2^2\cdot 3
\end{align}$$

Because the enumeration at both primes only contain a common factor of $2^2 = 4$, we have found all the torsion points. In addition, we know the point $(-3,9)$ has infinite order because otherwise there would be a prime factor shared by both enumerations, so the rank is at least $1$. Finally, establishing an upper bound for the rank requires arduously calculating the group $E(\mathbb{Q})/2E(\mathbb{Q}) \cong (\mathbb{Z}/2)^{r + 2}$ where $r = \operatorname{rank}(E(\mathbb{Q}))$, using some long exact sequences from homological algebra and the Kummer map.

== Theorems concerning special cases ==
There are many theorems in the literature about the structure of the Mordell–Weil groups of abelian varieties of specific dimension, over specific fields, or having some other special property.

=== Abelian varieties over the rational function field k(t) ===
For a hyperelliptic curve $C$ and an abelian variety $A$ defined over a fixed field $k$, we denote the $A_b$ the twist of $A|_{k(t)}$ (the pullback of $A$ to the function field $k(t) = k(\mathbb{P}^1)$) by a 1-cocyle

$b \in Z^1(\operatorname{Gal}(k(C)/k(t)), \text{Aut}(A))$

for Galois cohomology of the field extension associated to the covering map $f:C \to \mathbb{P}^1$. Note $G = \operatorname{Gal}(k(C)/k(t) \cong \mathbb{Z}/2$ which follows from the map being hyperelliptic. More explicitly, this 1-cocyle is given as a map of groups

$G\times G \to \operatorname{Aut}(A)$

which using universal properties is the same as giving two maps $G \to \text{Aut}(A)$, hence we can write it as a map

$b = (b_{id}, b_{\iota})$

where $b_{id}$ is the inclusion map and $b_\iota$ is sent to negative $\operatorname{Id}_A$. This can be used to define the twisted abelian variety $A_b$ defined over $k(t)$ using general theory of algebraic geometry^{pg 5}. In particular, from universal properties of this construction, $A_b$ is an abelian variety over $k(t)$ which is isomorphic to $A|_{k(C)}$ after base-change to $k(C)$.

==== Theorem ====
For the setup given above, there is an isomorphism of abelian groups

$A_b(k(t)) \cong \operatorname{Hom}_k(J(C), A)\oplus A_2(k)$

where $J(C)$ is the Jacobian of the curve $C$, and $A_2$ is the 2-torsion subgroup of $A$.

== See also ==
- Mordell–Weil theorem
