= Arul Shankar =

Indian mathematician

Arul Shankar is an Indian mathematician at the University of Toronto Mississauga specializing in number theory, particularly arithmetic statistics.

== Education ==
He received his B.Sc. (honours) in mathematics and computer science from the Chennai Mathematical Institute in 2007. During his undergraduate studies, he was awarded the CMI Medal of Excellence in Mathematics for outstanding academic performance at the institute’s first convocation as a deemed university. Through CMI’s exchange programme with the École Normale Supérieure, Paris, he undertook an eight-week summer research visit at ENS in May–June 2007.

He obtained his PhD from Princeton University in 2012 under Manjul Bhargava. Shankar is known for his work, with Bhargava, establishing unconditionally that the average rank of elliptic curves is bounded when ordered by naive height by $1.5$ and $1.17$ respectively, thus proving the Birch and Swinnerton-Dyer conjecture for a positive proportion of elliptic curves.

In 2018 he was awarded a Sloan Research Fellowship, one of the most prestigious early career research fellowships available to mathematicians. He was named a Simons Fellow in Mathematics in 2024, a fellowship awarded by the Simons Foundation to support research leave for established mathematicians.
