= Néron differential =

1-form on an elliptic curve

In mathematics, a Néron differential, named after André Néron, is an almost canonical choice of 1-form on an elliptic curve or abelian variety defined over a local field or global field. The Néron differential behaves well on the Néron minimal models.

For an elliptic curve of the form

$$y^2+a_1xy+a_3y=x^3+a_2x^2+a_4x+a_6$$

the Néron differential is

$$\frac{dx}{2y+a_1x+a_3}$$
