= Élie Cartan Prize =

Mathematics prize

The Élie Cartan Prize (Prix Élie Cartan) is awarded every three years by the Institut de France, Académie des Sciences, Fondation Élie Cartan, to recognize a mathematician who has introduced new ideas or solved a difficult problem. The prize, named for mathematician Élie Cartan, was established in 1980 and carries a monetary award.

== Recipients ==
The recipients of the Élie Cartan Prize are:

- 1981: Dennis P. Sullivan
- 1984: Mikhael Gromov
- 1987: Johannes Sjöstrand
- 1990: Jean Bourgain
- 1993: Clifford H. Taubes
- 1996: Don Zagier
- 1999: Laurent Clozel
- 2002: Jean-Benoît Bost
- 2006: Emmanuel Ullmo
- 2009: Raphaël Rouquier
- 2012: Francis Brown
- 2015: Anna Erschler
- 2018: Vincent Pilloni
- 2022: Romain Dujardin

== See also ==
- List of mathematics awards
