= Raphaël Rouquier =

French academic and mathematician

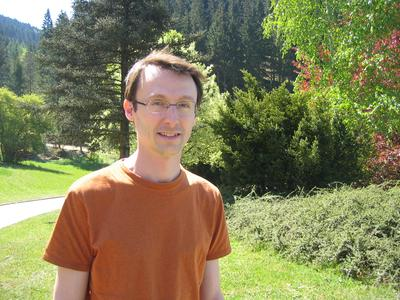
- Rouquier at Oberwolfach in 2007
- Born: 9 December 1969 (age 56); Étampes, France
- Education: Paris Diderot University
- Awards: Whitehead Prize (2006); Adams Prize (2009); Elie Cartan Prize (2009)
- Scientific career
- Workplaces: CNRS; University of Leeds; University of Oxford; UCLA
- Doctoral advisor: Michel Broué and J.G. Thompson

Raphaël Alexis Marcel Rouquier (born 9 December 1969) is a French mathematician and a professor of mathematics at UCLA.

== Education ==
Rouquier was born in Étampes, France.

Rouquier studied at the École Normale Supérieure from 1988 to 1989 and from 1989 to 1990 for a DEA in mathematics under the direction of Michel Broué, where he continued to study for his PhD. Rouquier spent the second year of his PhD study at the University of Cambridge under the supervision of J. G. Thompson.

== Career ==
He was hired by the CNRS in 1992 where he completed his PhD (1992) and Habilitation (1998–1999). He was appointed director of research there in 2003. From 2005 to 2006 he was Professor of Representation Theory at the Department of Pure Mathematics at the University of Leeds before moving to the University of Oxford as the Waynflete Professor of Pure Mathematics. In 2012, he moved to UCLA.

== Awards and honors ==
He was awarded the Whitehead Prize in 2006 and the Adams Prize in 2009 for contributions to representation theory. He was awarded the Élie Cartan Prize in 2009. In 2012 he became a fellow of the American Mathematical Society. In 2015 he became a Simons Investigator.

He gave the Peccot Lectures at Collège de France in 2000, the Whittemore Lectures at Yale University in 2005, an Algebra Section lecture at the International Congress of Mathematicians in 2006, the Albert Lectures at the University of Chicago in 2008, the Moursund Lectures at the University of Oregon in 2013, the Simons Lectures at MIT in 2013, the CBMS Lectures in 2014 and the Ellis Kolchin Memorial Lecture at Columbia University in 2016.
