= Conductor–discriminant formula =

In mathematics, the conductor–discriminant formula or Führerdiskriminantenproduktformel, introduced by Hasse (1926, 1930) for abelian extensions and by Artin (1931) for Galois extensions, is a formula calculating the relative discriminant of a finite Galois extension $L/K$ of local or global fields from the Artin conductors of the irreducible characters $\mathrm{Irr}(G)$ of the Galois group $G = G(L/K)$.

== Statement ==
Let $L/K$ be a finite Galois extension of global fields with Galois group $G$. Then the discriminant equals

$$\mathfrak{d}_{L/K} = \prod_{\chi \in \mathrm{Irr}(G)}\mathfrak{f}(\chi)^{\chi(1)},$$

where $\mathfrak{f}(\chi)$ equals the global Artin conductor of $\chi$.

== Example ==
Let $L = \mathbf{Q}(\zeta_{p^n})/\mathbf{Q}$ be a cyclotomic extension of the rationals. The Galois group $G$ equals $(\mathbf{Z}/p^n)^\times$. Because $(p)$ is the only finite prime ramified, the global Artin conductor $\mathfrak{f}(\chi)$ equals the local one $\mathfrak{f}_{(p)}(\chi)$. Because $G$ is abelian, every non-trivial irreducible character $\chi$ is of degree $1 = \chi(1)$. Then, the local Artin conductor of $\chi$ equals the conductor of the $\mathfrak{p}$-adic completion of $L^\chi = L^{\mathrm{ker}(\chi)}/\mathbf{Q}$, i.e. $(p)^{n_p}$, where $n_p$ is the smallest natural number such that $U_{\mathbf{Q}_p}^{(n_p)} \subseteq N_{L^\chi_\mathfrak{p}/\mathbf{Q}_p}(U_{L^\chi_\mathfrak{p}})$. If $p > 2$, the Galois group $G(L_\mathfrak{p}/\mathbf{Q}_p) = G(L/\mathbf{Q}) = (\mathbf{Z}/p^n)^\times$ is cyclic of order $\varphi(p^n)$, and by local class field theory and using that $U_{\mathbf{Q}_p}/U^{(k)}_{\mathbf{Q}_p} = (\mathbf{Z}/p^k)^\times$ one sees easily that if $\chi$ factors through a primitive character of $(\mathbf{Z}/p^i)^\times$, then $\mathfrak{f}_{(p)}(\chi) = p^i$ whence as there are $\varphi(p^i) - \varphi(p^{i-1})$ primitive characters of $(\mathbf{Z}/p^i)^\times$ we obtain from the formula $\mathfrak{d}_{L/\mathbf{Q}} = (p^{\varphi(p^n)(n - 1/(p-1))})$, the exponent is

$$\sum_{i = 0}^{n} (\varphi(p^i) - \varphi(p^{i-1}))i = n\varphi(p^n) - 1 - (p-1)\sum_{i=0}^{n-2}p^i = n\varphi(p^n) - p^{n-1}.$$
