= Conductor of an abelian variety =

In mathematics, in Diophantine geometry, the conductor of an abelian variety defined over a local or global field F is a measure of how "bad" the bad reduction at some prime is. It is connected to the ramification in the field generated by the torsion points.

== Definition ==
For an abelian variety A defined over a field F as above, with ring of integers R, consider the Néron model of A, which is a 'best possible' model of A defined over R. This model may be represented as a scheme over

Spec(R)

(cf. spectrum of a ring) for which the generic fibre constructed by means of the morphism

Spec(F) → Spec(R)

gives back A. Let A^{0} denote the open subgroup scheme of the Néron model whose fibres are the connected components. For a maximal ideal P of R with residue field k, A^{0}_{k} is a group variety over k, hence an extension of an abelian variety by a linear group. This linear group is an extension of a torus by a unipotent group. Let u_{P} be the dimension of the unipotent group and t_{P} the dimension of the torus. The order of the conductor at P is

$$f_P = 2u_P + t_P + \delta_P , \,$$

where $\delta_P\in\mathbb N$ is a measure of wild ramification. When F is a number field, the conductor ideal of A is given by

$$f= \prod_P P^{f_P}.$$

== Properties ==
- A has good reduction at P if and only if $u_P=t_P=0$ (which implies $f_P=\delta_P= 0$).
- A has semistable reduction if and only if $u_P=0$ (then again $\delta_P= 0$).
- If A acquires semistable reduction over a Galois extension of F of degree prime to p, the residue characteristic at P, then δ_{P} = 0.
- If $p> 2d+1$, where d is the dimension of A, then $\delta_P=0$.
- If $p\le 2d+1$ and F is a finite extension of $\mathbb{Q}_p$ of ramification degree $e(F/\mathbb{Q}_p)$, there is an upper bound expressed in terms of the function $L_p(n)$, which is defined as follows:

Write $n=\sum_{k\ge0}c_kp^k$ with $0\le c_k<p$ and set $L_p(n)=\sum_{k\ge0}kc_kp^k$. Then

$$(*)\qquad f_P \le 2d + e(F/\mathbb{Q}_p) \left( p \left\lfloor \frac{2d}{p-1} \right\rfloor  + (p-1)L_p\left( \left\lfloor \frac{2d}{p-1} \right\rfloor \right)     \right).$$

Further, for every $d,p,e$ with $p\le 2d+1$ there is a field $F/\mathbb{Q}_p$ with $e(F/\mathbb{Q}_p)=e$ and an abelian variety $A/F$ of dimension $d$ so that $(*)$ is an equality.
