= Nerone =

Nerone may refer to:

== Film ==
- Nerone (1909 film) (Nerone, o la caduta di Roma), an Italian short silent film
- Nerone (1930 film), an Italian comedy
- Nerone (1977 film), an Italian comedy

== Opera ==
- Nerone (Boito), a 1921 opera by Arrigo Boito
- Nerone (Mascagni), a 1935 opera by Pietro Mascagni
- Nerone, a 1735 opera by Egidio Duni
- Nerone, the principal male character in Monteverdi's 1643 opera L'incoronazione di Poppea

== Other uses ==
- Nerone (rapper) (Massimiliano Figlia, born 1991), Italian rapper
- Monte Nerone, a mountain in the Umbrian Apennines of central Italy

== See also ==
- Nero, a Roman emperor
- Neron (disambiguation)
- Nerone fatto Cesare, an opera by Antonio Vivaldi
- Torre di Nerone, part of the German Gothic Line of the Italian Campaign of World War II
