= Néron–Tate height =

In number theory, the Néron–Tate height (or canonical height) is a quadratic form on the Mordell–Weil group of rational points of an abelian variety defined over a global field. It is named after André Néron and John Tate.

== Definition and properties ==
Néron defined the Néron–Tate height as a sum of local heights. Although the global Néron–Tate height is quadratic, the constituent local heights are not quite quadratic. Tate (unpublished) defined it globally by observing that the logarithmic height $h_L$ associated to a symmetric invertible sheaf $L$ on an abelian variety $A$ is “almost quadratic,” and used this to show that the limit

$$\hat h_L(P) = \lim_{N\rightarrow\infty}\frac{h_L(NP)}{N^2}$$

exists, defines a quadratic form on the Mordell–Weil group of rational points, and satisfies

$$\hat h_L(P) = h_L(P) + O(1),$$

where the implied $O(1)$ constant is independent of $P$. If $L$ is anti-symmetric, that is $[-1]^*L=L^{-1}$, then the analogous limit

$$\hat h_L(P) = \lim_{N\rightarrow\infty}\frac{h_L(NP)}{N}$$

converges and satisfies $\hat h_L(P) = h_L(P) + O(1)$, but in this case $\hat h_L$ is a linear function on the Mordell-Weil group. For general invertible sheaves, one writes $L^{\otimes2} = (L\otimes[-1]^*L)\otimes(L\otimes[-1]^*L^{-1})$ as a product of a symmetric sheaf and an anti-symmetric sheaf, and then

$$\hat h_L(P) = \frac12 \hat h_{L\otimes[-1]^*L}(P) + \frac12 \hat h_{L\otimes[-1]^*L^{-1}}(P)$$

is the unique quadratic function satisfying

$$\hat h_L(P) = h_L(P) + O(1) \quad\mbox{and}\quad \hat h_L(0)=0.$$

The Néron–Tate height depends on the choice of an invertible sheaf on the abelian variety, although the associated bilinear form depends only on the image of $L$ in the Néron–Severi group of $A$. If the abelian variety $A$ is defined over a number field K and the invertible sheaf is symmetric and ample, then the Néron–Tate height is positive definite in the sense that it vanishes only on torsion elements of the Mordell–Weil group $A(K)$. More generally, $\hat h_L$ induces a positive definite quadratic form on the real vector space $A(K)\otimes\mathbb{R}$.

On an elliptic curve, the Néron–Severi group is of rank one and has a unique ample generator, so this generator is often used to define the Néron–Tate height, which is denoted $\hat h$ without reference to a particular line bundle. (However, the height that naturally appears in the statement of the Birch and Swinnerton-Dyer conjecture is twice this height.) On abelian varieties of higher dimension, there need not be a particular choice of smallest ample line bundle to be used in defining the Néron–Tate height, and the height used in the statement of the Birch–Swinnerton-Dyer conjecture is the Néron–Tate height associated to the Poincaré line bundle on $A\times\hat A$, the product of $A$ with its dual.

== The elliptic and abelian regulators ==
The bilinear form associated to the canonical height $\hat h$ on an elliptic curve E is

$$\langle P,Q\rangle = \frac{1}{2} \bigl( \hat h(P+Q) - \hat h(P) - \hat h(Q) \bigr) .$$

The elliptic regulator of E/K is

$$\operatorname{Reg}(E/K) = \det\bigl( \langle P_i,P_j\rangle \bigr)_{1\le i,j\le r},$$

where P_{1},...,P_{r} is a basis for the Mordell–Weil group E(K) modulo torsion (cf. Gram determinant). The elliptic regulator does not depend on the choice of basis.

More generally, let A/K be an abelian variety, let B ≅ Pic^{0}(A) be the dual abelian variety to A, and let P be the Poincaré line bundle on A × B. Then the abelian regulator of A/K is defined by choosing a basis Q_{1},...,Q_{r} for the Mordell–Weil group A(K) modulo torsion and a basis η_{1},...,η_{r} for the Mordell–Weil group B(K) modulo torsion and setting

$$\operatorname{Reg}(A/K) = \det\bigl( \langle Q_i,\eta_j\rangle_{P} \bigr)_{1\le i,j\le r}.$$

(The definitions of elliptic and abelian regulator are not entirely consistent, since if A is an elliptic curve, then the latter is 2^{r} times the former.)

The elliptic and abelian regulators appear in the Birch–Swinnerton-Dyer conjecture.

== Lower bounds for the Néron–Tate height ==
There are two fundamental conjectures that give lower bounds for the Néron–Tate height. In the first, the field K is fixed and the elliptic curve E/K and point P ∈ E(K) vary, while in the second, the elliptic Lehmer conjecture, the curve E/K is fixed while the field of definition of the point P varies.

- (Lang) $\hat h(P) \ge c(K) \log\max\bigl\{\operatorname{Norm}_{K/\mathbb{Q}}\operatorname{Disc}(E/K),h(j(E))\bigr\}\quad$ for all $E/K$ and all nontorsion $P\in E(K).$
- (Lehmer) $\hat h(P) \ge \frac{c(E/K)}{[K(P):K]}$ for all nontorsion $P\in E(\bar K).$

In both conjectures, the constants are positive and depend only on the indicated quantities. (A stronger form of Lang's conjecture asserts that $c$ depends only on the degree $[K:\mathbb Q]$.) It is known that the abc conjecture implies Lang's conjecture, and that the analogue of Lang's conjecture over one dimensional characteristic 0 function fields is unconditionally true. The best general result on Lehmer's conjecture is the weaker estimate $\hat h(P)\ge c(E/K)/[K(P):K]^{3+\varepsilon}$ due to Masser. When the elliptic curve has complex multiplication, this has been improved to $\hat h(P)\ge c(E/K)/[K(P):K]^{1+\varepsilon}$ by Laurent. There are analogous conjectures for abelian varieties, with the nontorsion condition replaced by the condition that the multiples of $P$ form a Zariski dense subset of $A$, and the lower bound in Lang's conjecture replaced by $\hat h(P)\ge c(K)h(A/K)$, where $h(A/K)$ is the Faltings height of $A/K$.

== Call–Silverman Canonical Height ==
A polarized algebraic dynamical system is a triple $(V,\varphi, L)$ consisting of a (smooth projective) algebraic variety $V$, an endomorphism $\varphi:V \to V$, and a line bundle $L \to V$ with the property that $\varphi^*L = L^{\otimes d}$ for some integer $d > 1$. Gregory Call and Joseph Silverman defines an analogue of the Néron–Tate height, called the canonical height. It is given by the Tate limit

$$\hat h_{V,\varphi,L}(P) = \lim_{n\to\infty} \frac{h_{V,L}(\varphi^{(n)}(P))}{d^n},$$

where $\varphi^{(n)} = \varphi\circ \cdots \circ \varphi$ is the n-fold iteration of $\varphi$. For example, any morphism $\varphi: \mathbb{P}^n \to \mathbb{P}^n$ of degree $d > 1$ yields a canonical height associated to the line bundle relation $\varphi^*\mathcal{O}(1) = \mathcal{O}(n)$. If $V$ is defined over a number field and $L$ is ample, then the canonical height is non-negative, and

$$\hat h_{V,\varphi,L}(P) = 0 ~~ \Longleftrightarrow ~~ P \text{ is preperiodic for } \varphi.$$

($P$ is preperiodic if its forward orbit $P, \varphi(P), \varphi^2(P), \varphi^3(P),\ldots$ contains only finitely many distinct points.)
