= Diophantine geometry =

Mathematics of varieties with integer coordinates

In mathematics, Diophantine geometry is the study of Diophantine equations (the search for integer solutions of polynomial equations) by means of powerful methods in algebraic geometry. The extensive development of algebraic geometry in the 20^{th} century produced powerful tools to study these equations. Diophantine geometry is part of the broader field of arithmetic geometry.

Four theorems of fundamental importance in Diophantine geometry are:

- Mordell–Weil theorem
- Roth's theorem
- Siegel's theorem
- Faltings' theorem

Another major theorem is Mazur's torsion theorem. More modern examples include the André–Oort conjecture, the Bogomolov conjecture and also the uniform Mordell conjecture.

== Background ==
Serge Lang published a book Diophantine Geometry in 1962, which introduced the term "Diophantine geometry" and led to disagreement over the most promising framework for the solution of Diophantine equations.

The traditional arrangement of material on Diophantine equations was by degree and number of variables, as in Mordell's Diophantine Equations (1969). The Hilbert–Hurwitz result from 1890 reducing the Diophantine geometry of curves of genus 0 to degrees 1 and 2 (conic sections) occurs in Chapter 17, as does Mordell's conjecture. Siegel's theorem on integral points occurs in Chapter 28. Mordell's theorem on the finite generation of the group of rational points on an elliptic curve is in Chapter 16, and integer points on the Mordell curve in Chapter 26.

In a negative review of Lang's book, Mordell wrote:

In recent times, powerful new geometric ideas and methods have been developed by means of which important new arithmetical theorems and related results have been found and proved and some of these are not easily proved otherwise. Further, there has been a tendency to clothe the old results, their extensions, and proofs in the new geometrical language. Sometimes, however, the full implications of results are best described in a geometrical setting. Lang has these aspects very much in mind in this book, and seems to miss no opportunity for geometric presentation. This accounts for his title "Diophantine Geometry."

He notes that the content of the book is largely versions of the Mordell–Weil theorem, Thue–Siegel–Roth theorem, and Siegel's theorem, with a treatment of Hilbert's irreducibility theorem and applications in the style of Siegel. Leaving aside issues of generality, and a completely different style, the major mathematical difference between the two books is that Lang used abelian varieties and offered a proof of Siegel's theorem, while Mordell noted that the proof "is of a very advanced character" (p. 263).

Despite a bad press initially, Lang's conception has been widely accepted, and a 2006 tribute called the book "visionary". A larger field sometimes called arithmetic of abelian varieties now includes Diophantine geometry along with class field theory, complex multiplication, local zeta-functions and L-functions. Paul Vojta wrote:

While others at the time shared this viewpoint (e.g., Weil, Tate, Serre), it is easy to forget that others did not, as Mordell's review of Diophantine Geometry attests.

== Approaches ==
A single equation defines a hypersurface, and simultaneous Diophantine equations give rise to a general algebraic variety V over K; the typical question is about the nature of the set V(K) of points on V with co-ordinates in K, and by means of height functions, quantitative questions about the "size" of these solutions may be posed, as well as the qualitative issues of whether any points exist, and if so whether there are an infinite number. Given the geometric approach, the consideration of homogeneous equations and homogeneous co-ordinates is fundamental, for the same reasons that projective geometry is the dominant approach in algebraic geometry. Rational number solutions therefore are the primary consideration; but integral solutions (i.e., integer lattice points) can be treated in the same way as an affine variety may be considered inside a projective variety that has extra points at infinity.

The general approach of Diophantine geometry is illustrated by Faltings' theorem (a conjecture of L. J. Mordell) stating that an algebraic curve C of genus g > 1 over the rational numbers has only finitely many rational points. The first result of this kind may have been the theorem of Hilbert and Hurwitz dealing with the case g = 0. The theory consists both of theorems and many conjectures and open questions.

== See also ==
- Glossary of arithmetic and Diophantine geometry
- Arakelov geometry
