= Tate's algorithm =

Algorithm in the theory of elliptic curves

In the theory of elliptic curves, Tate's algorithm takes as input an integral model of an elliptic curve E over $\mathbb{Q}$, or more generally an algebraic number field, and a prime or prime ideal p. It returns the exponent f_{p} of p in the conductor of E, the type of reduction at p, the local index

$$c_p=[E(\mathbb{Q}_p):E^0(\mathbb{Q}_p)],$$

where $E^0(\mathbb{Q}_p)$ is the group of $\mathbb{Q}_p$-points whose reduction mod p is a non-singular point. Also, the algorithm determines whether or not the given integral model is minimal at p, and, if not, returns an integral model with integral coefficients for which the valuation at p of the discriminant is minimal.

Tate's algorithm also gives the structure of the singular fibers given by the Kodaira symbol or Néron symbol, for which, see elliptic surface: in turn this determines the exponent f_{p} of the conductor E.

Tate's algorithm can be greatly simplified if the characteristic of the residue class field is not 2 or 3; in this case the type and c and f can be read off from the valuations of j and Δ (defined below).

Tate's algorithm was introduced by John Tate (1975) as an improvement of the description of the Néron model of an elliptic curve by Néron (1964).

== Notation ==
Assume that all the coefficients of the equation of the curve lie in a complete discrete valuation ring R with perfect residue field K and maximal ideal generated by a prime π. The elliptic curve is given by the equation

$$y^2+a_1xy+a_3y = x^3+a_2x^2+a_4x+a_6.$$

Define:

$v(\Delta)=$ the p-adic valuation of $\pi$ in $\Delta$, that is, exponent of $\pi$ in prime factorization of $\Delta$, or infinity if $\Delta = 0$
$$a_{i,m}=a_i/\pi^m$$
$$b_2=a_1^2+4a_2$$
$$b_4=a_1a_3+2a_4^{}$$
$$b_6=a_3^2+4a_6$$
$$b_8=a_1^2a_6-a_1a_3a_4+4a_2a_6+a_2a_3^2-a_4^2$$
$$c_4=b_2^2-24b_4$$
$$c_6=-b_2^3+36b_2b_4-216b_6$$
$$\Delta=-b_2^2b_8-8b_4^3-27b_6^2+9b_2b_4b_6$$
$$j=c_4^3/\Delta.$$

== The algorithm ==
- Step 1: If π does not divide Δ then the type is I_{0}, c=1 and f=0.
- Step 2: If π divides Δ but not c_{4} then the type is I_{v} with v = v(Δ), c=v, and f=1.
- Step 3. Otherwise, change coordinates so that π divides a_{3},a_{4},a_{6}. If π^{2} does not divide a_{6} then the type is II, c=1, and f=v(Δ);
- Step 4. Otherwise, if π^{3} does not divide b_{8} then the type is III, c=2, and f=v(Δ)−1;
- Step 5. Otherwise, let Q_{1} be the polynomial

$$Q_1(Y) = Y^2+a_{3,1}Y-a_{6,2}.$$.

If π^{3} does not divide b_{6} then the type is IV, c=3 if $Q_1(Y)$ has two roots in K and 1 if it has two roots outside of K, and f=v(Δ)−2.

- Step 6. Otherwise, change coordinates so that π divides a_{1} and a_{2}, π^{2} divides a_{3} and a_{4}, and π^{3} divides a_{6}. Let P be the polynomial

$$P(T) = T^3+a_{2,1}T^2+a_{4,2}T+a_{6,3}.$$

If $P(T)$ has 3 distinct roots modulo π then the type is I_{0}^{*}, f=v(Δ)−4, and c is 1+(number of roots of P in K).

- Step 7. If P has one single and one double root, then the type is I_{ν}^{*} for some ν>0, f=v(Δ)−4−ν, c=2 or 4: there is a "sub-algorithm" for dealing with this case.
- Step 8. If P has a triple root, change variables so the triple root is 0, so that π^{2} divides a_{2} and π^{3} divides a_{4}, and π^{4} divides a_{6}. Let Q_{2} be the polynomial

$$Q_2(Y) = Y^2+a_{3,2}Y-a_{6,4}.$$.

If $Q_2(Y)$ has two distinct roots modulo π then the type is IV^{*}, f=v(Δ)−6, and c is 3 if the roots are in K, 1 otherwise.

- Step 9. If $Q_2(Y)$ has a double root, change variables so the double root is 0. Then π^{3} divides a_{3} and π^{5} divides a_{6}. If π^{4} does not divide a_{4} then the type is III^{*} and f=v(Δ)−7 and c = 2.
- Step 10. Otherwise if π^{6} does not divide a_{6} then the type is II^{*} and f=v(Δ)−8 and c = 1.
- Step 11. Otherwise the equation is not minimal. Divide each a_{n} by π^{n} and go back to step 1.

== Implementations ==
The algorithm is implemented for algebraic number fields in the PARI/GP computer algebra system, available through the function elllocalred.
