= Louis J. Mordell =

American-born British mathematician (1888-1972)

Louis Mordell
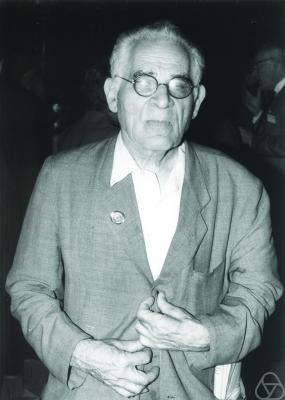
- Louis Mordell in Nice, 1970.
- Born: Louis Joel Mordell; 28 January 1888; Philadelphia, Pennsylvania
- Died: 12 March 1972 (aged 84)
- Education: St John's College, Cambridge
- Known for: Mordell conjecture Chowla–Mordell theorem Erdős–Mordell inequality Mordell–Weil theorem Mordell curve
- Spouse: Mabel Elizabeth Cambridge
- Children: Kathleen, Donald
- Awards: Smith's Prize (1912); De Morgan Medal (1941); Senior Berwick Prize (1946); Sylvester Medal (1949); Fellow of the Royal Society
- Scientific career
- Fields: Mathematics
- Workplaces: Birkbeck College; UMIST; Victoria University of Manchester; University of Cambridge
- Doctoral advisor: Henry Frederick Baker
- Doctoral students: Ram Prakash Bambah; J. W. S. Cassels

Louis Joel Mordell (28 January 1888 – 12 March 1972) was an American-born British mathematician, known for his research in number theory. He was born in Philadelphia, United States, in a Jewish family of Lithuanian extraction.

== Education ==
Mordell was educated at the University of Cambridge where he completed the Cambridge Mathematical Tripos as a student of St John's College, Cambridge, starting in 1906 after successfully passing the scholarship examination. He graduated as third wrangler in 1909.

== Research ==
After graduating Mordell began independent research into particular diophantine equations: the question of integer points on the cubic curve, and special case of what is now called a Thue equation, the Mordell equation

y^{2} = x^{3} + k.

He took an appointment at Birkbeck College, London in 1913. During World War I he was involved in war work, but also produced one of his major results, proving in 1917 the multiplicative property of Srinivasa Ramanujan's tau-function. The proof was by means, in effect, of the Hecke operators, which had not yet been named after Erich Hecke; it was, in retrospect, one of the major advances in modular form theory, beyond its status as an odd corner of the theory of special functions.

In 1920, he took a teaching position in UMIST. At a General Meeting of the Manchester Literary & Philosophical Society on 2 November 1920, Mr. L. J. Morpett, B.A., Lecturer in Mathematics, The College of Technology, Manchester; was elected to membership. . He became the holder of the Fielden Chair of Pure Mathematics at the University of Manchester in 1922 and Professor in 1923. There he developed a third area of interest within number theory, the geometry of numbers. His basic work on Mordell's theorem is from 1921 to 1922, as is the formulation of the Mordell conjecture. He was an Invited Speaker of the International Congress of Mathematicians (ICM) in 1928 in Bologna and in 1932 in Zürich and a Plenary Speaker of the ICM in 1936 in Oslo.

He took British citizenship in 1929. In Manchester he also built up the department, offering posts to a number of outstanding mathematicians who had been forced from posts on the continent of Europe. He brought in Reinhold Baer, G. Billing, Paul Erdős, Chao Ko, Kurt Mahler, and Beniamino Segre. He also recruited J. A. Todd, Patrick du Val, Harold Davenport and Laurence Chisholm Young, and invited distinguished visitors.

In 1945, he returned to Cambridge as a Fellow of St. John's, when elected to the Sadleirian Chair, and became Head of Department. He officially retired in 1953. It was at this time that he had his only formal research students, of whom J. W. S. Cassels was one. His idea of supervising research was said to involve the suggestion that a proof of the transcendence of the Euler–Mascheroni constant was probably worth a doctorate. His book Diophantine Equations (1969) is based on lectures, and gives an idea of his discursive style. Mordell is said to have hated administrative duties.

== Anecdote ==
While visiting the University of Calgary, the elderly Mordell attended the Number Theory seminars and would frequently fall asleep during them. According to a story by number theorist Richard K. Guy, the department head at the time, after Mordell had fallen asleep, someone in the audience asked "Isn't that Stickelberger's theorem?" The speaker said "No it isn't." A few minutes later the person interrupted again and said "I'm positive that's Stickelberger's theorem!" The speaker again said no it wasn't. The lecture ended, and the applause woke up Mordell, and he looked up and pointed at the board, saying "There's old Stickelberger's result!"

== See also ==
- Mordell–Weil group

Educational offices
Preceded by (none)	Fielden Chair of Pure Mathematics; 1922–1945	Succeeded by Max Newman
