= Artin conductor =

In number theory, the Artin conductor is a number or ideal associated to a character of a Galois group of a local or global field, introduced by Emil Artin as an expression appearing in the functional equation of an Artin L-function.

== Local Artin conductors ==
Suppose that $L$ is a finite Galois extension of the local field $K$, with Galois group $G$. If $\chi$ is a character of $G$, then the Artin conductor of $\chi$ is the number

$$f(\chi)=\sum_{i\ge 0}\frac{g_i}{g_0}(\chi(1)-\chi(G_i)),$$

where $G_i$ is the $i$-th ramification group (in lower numbering), of order $g_i$, and $\chi(G_i)$ is the average value of $\chi$ on $G_i$. The local conductor is an integer. Heuristically, the Artin conductor measures how far the action of the higher ramification groups is from being trivial. In particular, if $\chi$ is unramified, then its Artin conductor is zero. Thus, if $L$ is unramified over $K$, then the Artin conductors of all $\chi$ are zero.

The wild invariant or Swan conductor of the character is

$$f(\chi) - (\chi(1)-\chi(G_0)),$$

in other words, the sum of the higher order terms with $i>0$.

== Global Artin conductors ==
The global Artin conductor of a representation $\chi$ of the Galois group $G$ of a finite extension $L/K$ of global fields is an ideal of $K$, defined to be

$$\mathfrak{f}(\chi) = \prod_p p^{f(\chi,p)}$$

where the product is over the primes $p$ of $K$, and $f(\chi,p)$ is the local Artin conductor of the restriction of $\chi$ to the decomposition group of some prime of $L$ lying over $p$. Since the local Artin conductor is zero at unramified primes, the above product only need be taken over primes that ramify in $L/K$.

== Artin representation and Artin character ==
Suppose that $L$ is a finite Galois extension of the local field $K$, with Galois group $G$. The Artin character $a_G$ of $G$ is the character

$$a_G=\sum_\chi f(\chi)\chi$$

and the Artin representation $A_G$ is the complex linear representation of G with this character. Weil (1946) asked for a direct construction of the Artin representation. Serre (1960) showed that the Artin representation can be realized over the local field $\Q_\ell$, for any prime $\ell$ not equal to the residue characteristic $p$. Fontaine (1971) showed that it can be realized over the corresponding ring of Witt vectors. It cannot in general be realized over the rationals or over the local field $\Q_p$, suggesting that there is no easy way to construct the Artin representation explicitly.

== Swan representation ==
The Swan character sw_{G} is given by

$$sw_G= a_G -r_G+1$$

where r_{g} is the character of the regular representation and 1 is the character of the trivial representation. The Swan character is the character of a representation of G. Swan (1963) showed that there is a unique projective representation of G over the l-adic integers with character the Swan character.

== Applications ==
The Artin conductor appears in the conductor-discriminant formula for the discriminant of a global field.

The optimal level in the Serre modularity conjecture is expressed in terms of the Artin conductor.

The Artin conductor appears in the functional equation of the Artin L-function.

The Artin and Swan representations are used to define the conductor of an elliptic curve or abelian variety.
