= Conductor (company) =

Marketing company based in New York City

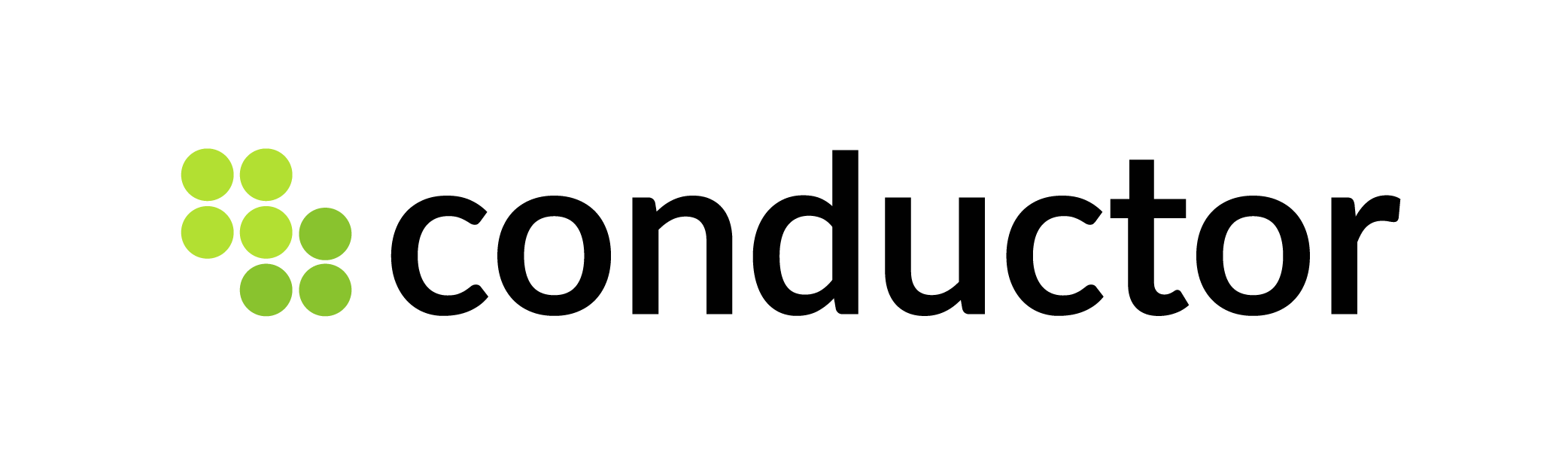
- Type: Private
- Industry: Digital marketing
- Headquarters: New York City, New York
- Website: conductor.com

Conductor is a software company that provides enterprise software for analyzing and implementing search engine optimization, generative engine optimization and content marketing.

Founded in 2006, Conductor began as a marketing services company. In 2010, Conductor launched its cloud-based software platform.

== History ==
Conductor was established in New York City in 2006 by Jeremy HurDuboys and Seth Besmertnik.

In 2012, Conductor ranked 38th on the Inc. 5000 list of U.S. companies and raised $20 million in financing. The company expanded in 2014 with the opening of an office in San Francisco. In 2015, Conductor raised a $27 million Series D round of funding, with Seth Besmertnik as CEO.

In 2016, Conductor introduced Insight Stream, a solution that combines data from multiple marketing technologies, including Deepcrawl, Dragon Metrics, and Google Search Console, into a single stream.

In 2018, it was announced that WeWork would acquire Conductor. The company later spun off from WeWork in 2019 and became an independent employee-owned organization. Conductor had 270 employees at the time of the spinoff.

In 2022, Conductor acquired ContentKing, following a $150 million funding round. In 2023, the company acquired Searchmetrics for undisclosed terms.

== Reception ==
In a review of Conductor's SEO tool, Pawan Singh of TechRadar called the interface "neat, intuitive, and easy to navigate" but found the features to be "daunting". Softonic reviewer Pedro Domínguez had a similar criticism, writing that it had a "steep learning curve" and was priced above rival products. He liked that it provided "advanced analysis" and a broad range of features such as review of backlink data.
