= Nero the Second =

Jacobite songs

"Nero the Second" or "Nero II" is a traditional ballad that was popular amongst Jacobites in Great Britain and Ireland during the first half of the eighteenth century.

Composed around 1715, the year of a major Jacobite rising, it was considered a seditious libel by the authorities. The Nero of the title, a reference to the tyrannical Roman Emperor Nero, is a thinly disguised version of George I the Hanoverian who had come to the throne in 1714. Jacobites supported a rival Stuart claimant, the English-born James Francis Edward Stuart, styled James III by his followers, who was now living in exile.

== Bibliography ==
- Fenlon, Jane. The Dukes of Ormonde, 1610–1745. Boydell & Brewer, 2000.
- Grosart, Alexander Balloch . English Jacobite ballads, songs & satires, etc 1877.
- Keymer, Thomas. Poetics of the Pillory: English Literature and Seditious Libel, 1660-1820. Oxford University Press, 2019.
- Monod, Paul Kleber. Jacobitism and the English People, 1688–1788. Cambridge University Press, 1993
