= Conductor (ring theory) =

In ring theory, a branch of mathematics, the conductor is a measurement of how far apart a commutative ring and an extension ring are. Most often, the larger ring is a domain integrally closed in its field of fractions, and then the conductor measures the failure of the smaller ring to be integrally closed.

The conductor is of great importance in the study of non-maximal orders in the ring of integers of an algebraic number field. One interpretation of the conductor is that it measures the failure of unique factorization into prime ideals.

== Definition ==
Let A and B be commutative rings, and assume A ⊆ B. The conductor of A in B is the ideal

$$\mathfrak{f}(B/A) = \operatorname{Ann}_A(B/A).$$

Here B /A is viewed as a quotient of A-modules, and Ann denotes the annihilator. More concretely, the conductor is the set

$$\mathfrak{f}(B/A) = \{ a \in A \colon aB \subseteq A \}.$$

Because the conductor is defined as an annihilator, it is an ideal of A.

If B is an integral domain, then the conductor may be rewritten as

$$\{0\} \cup \left\{ a \in A \setminus \{0\} : B \subseteq \textstyle\frac{1}{a}A \right\},$$

where $\textstyle\frac{1}{a}A$ is considered as a subset of the fraction field of B. That is, if a is non-zero and in the conductor, then every element of B may be written as a fraction whose numerator is in A and whose denominator is a. Therefore the non-zero elements of the conductor are those that suffice as common denominators when writing elements of B as quotients of elements of A.

Suppose R is a ring containing B. For example, R might equal B, or B might be a domain and R its field of fractions. Then, because 1 ∈ B, the conductor is also equal to

$$\{ r \in R : rB \subseteq A \}.$$

== Elementary properties ==
The conductor is the whole ring A if and only if it contains 1 ∈ A and, therefore, if and only if A = B. Otherwise, the conductor is a proper ideal of A.

If the index m = [B : A] is finite, then mB ⊆ A, so $m \in \mathfrak{f}(B/A)$. In this case, the conductor is non-zero. This applies in particular when B is the ring of integers in an algebraic number field and A is an order (a subring for which B /A is finite).

The conductor is also an ideal of B, because, for any b in B and any a in $\mathfrak{f}(B/A)$, baB ⊆ aB ⊆ A. In fact, an ideal J of B is contained in A if and only if J is contained in the conductor. Indeed, for such a J, JB ⊆ J ⊆ A, so by definition J is contained in $\mathfrak{f}(B/A)$. Conversely, the conductor is an ideal of A, so any ideal contained in it is contained in A. This fact implies that $\mathfrak{f}(B/A)$ is the largest ideal of A which is also an ideal of B. (It can happen that there are ideals of A contained in the conductor which are not ideals of B.)

Suppose that S is a multiplicative subset of A. Then

$$S^{-1}\mathfrak{f}(B/A) \subseteq \mathfrak{f}(S^{-1}B/S^{-1}A),$$

with equality in the case that B is a finitely generated A-module.

== Conductors of Dedekind domains ==
Some of the most important applications of the conductor arise when B is a Dedekind domain and B /A is finite. For example, B can be the ring of integers of a number field and A a non-maximal order. Or, B can be the affine coordinate ring of a smooth projective curve over a finite field and A the affine coordinate ring of a singular model. The ring A does not have unique factorization into prime ideals, and the failure of unique factorization is measured by the conductor $\mathfrak{f}(B/A)$.

Ideals coprime to the conductor share many of pleasant properties of ideals in Dedekind domains. Furthermore, for these ideals there is a tight correspondence between ideals of B and ideals of A:

- The ideals of A that are relatively prime to $\mathfrak{f}(B/A)$ have unique factorization into products of invertible prime ideals that are coprime to the conductor. In particular, all such ideals are invertible.
- If I is an ideal of B that is relatively prime to $\mathfrak{f}(B/A)$, then I ∩ A is an ideal of A that is relatively prime to $\mathfrak{f}(B/A)$ and the natural ring homomorphism $A / (I \cap A) \to B / I$ is an isomorphism. In particular, I is prime if and only if I ∩ A is prime.
- If J is an ideal of A that is relatively prime to $\mathfrak{f}(B/A)$, then JB is an ideal of B that is relatively prime to $\mathfrak{f}(B/A)$ and the natural ring homomorphism $A / J \to B / JB$ is an isomorphism. In particular, J is prime if and only if JB is prime.
- The functions $I \mapsto I \cap A$ and $J \mapsto JB$ define a bijection between ideals of A relatively prime to $\mathfrak{f}(B/A)$ and ideals of B relatively prime to $\mathfrak{f}(B/A)$. This bijection preserves the property of being prime. It is also multiplicative, that is, $(I \cap A)(I' \cap A) = II' \cap A$ and $(JB)(J'B) = JJ'B$.

All of these properties fail in general for ideals not coprime to the conductor. To see some of the difficulties that may arise, assume that J is a non-zero ideal of both A and B (in particular, it is contained in, hence not coprime to, the conductor). Then J cannot be an invertible fractional ideal of A unless A = B. Because B is a Dedekind domain, J is invertible in B, and therefore

$$\{ x \in K \colon xJ \subseteq J \} = B,$$

since we may multiply both sides of the equation xJ ⊆ J by J^{−1}. If J is also invertible in A, then the same reasoning applies. But the left-hand side of the above equation makes no reference to A or B, only to their shared fraction field, and therefore A = B. Therefore being an ideal of both A and B implies non-invertibility in A.

== Conductors of quadratic number fields ==
Let K be a quadratic extension of Q, and let O_{K} be its ring of integers. By extending 1 ∈ O_{K} to a Z-basis, we see that every order O in K has the form Z + cO_{K} for some positive integer c. The conductor of this order equals the ideal cO_{K}. Indeed, it is clear that cO_{K} is an ideal of O_{K} contained in O, so it is contained in the conductor. On the other hand, the ideals of O containing cO_{K} are the same as ideals of the quotient ring (Z + cO_{K}) / cO_{K}. The latter ring is isomorphic to Z / cZ by the second isomorphism theorem, so all such ideals of O are the sum of cO_{K} with an ideal of Z. Under this isomorphism, the conductor annihilates Z / cZ, so it must be cZ.

In this case, the index [O_{K} : O] is also equal to c, so for orders of quadratic number fields, the index may be identified with the conductor. This identification fails for higher degree number fields.

== See also ==
- Integral element
