= Néron–Severi group =

Group in algebraic geometry

In algebraic geometry, the Néron–Severi group of a variety is the group of divisors modulo algebraic equivalence; in other words it is the group of components of the Picard scheme of a variety. Its rank is called the Picard number. It is named after Francesco Severi and André Néron.

== Definition ==
In the cases of most importance to classical algebraic geometry, for a complete variety V that is non-singular, the connected component of the identity of the Picard scheme is an abelian variety written

Pic^{0}(V).

The quotient

Pic(V)/Pic^{0}(V)

is an abelian group NS(V), called the Néron–Severi group of V. This is a finitely-generated abelian group by the Néron–Severi theorem, which was proved by Severi over the complex numbers and by Néron over more general fields.

In other words, the Picard group fits into an exact sequence

$$1\to \mathrm{Pic}^0(V)\to\mathrm{Pic}(V)\to \mathrm{NS}(V)\to 0$$

The fact that the rank is finite is Francesco Severi's theorem of the base; the rank is the Picard number of V, often denoted ρ(V). The elements of finite order are called Severi divisors, and form a finite group which is a birational invariant and whose order is called the Severi number. Geometrically NS(V) describes the algebraic equivalence classes of divisors on V; that is, using a stronger, non-linear equivalence relation in place of linear equivalence of divisors, the classification becomes amenable to discrete invariants. Algebraic equivalence is closely related to numerical equivalence, an essentially topological classification by intersection numbers.

== First Chern class and integral valued 2-cocycles ==
The exponential sheaf sequence

$$0\to 2\pi i\mathbb Z \to \mathcal O_V\to\mathcal O_V^*\to 0$$

gives rise to a long exact sequence featuring

$$\cdots \to H^1(V, \mathcal O_V^*)\to H^2(V, 2\pi i \mathbb Z)\to H^2(V,\mathcal O_V)\to \cdots.$$

The first arrow is the first Chern class on the Picard group

$$c_1 \colon \mathrm {Pic}(V)\to H^2(V, \mathbb Z),$$

and the Neron-Severi group can be identified with its image. Equivalently, by exactness, the Neron-Severi group is the kernel of the second arrow

$$\exp^* \colon H^2(V, 2\pi i\mathbb Z)\to H^2(V,\mathcal O_V).$$

In the complex case, the Neron-Severi group is therefore the group of 2-cocycles whose Poincaré dual is represented by a complex hypersurface, that is, a Weil divisor.

=== For complex tori ===
Complex tori are special because they have multiple equivalent definitions of the Neron-Severi group. One definition uses its complex structure for the definition^{pg 30}. For a complex torus $X = V/\Lambda$, where $V$ is a complex vector space of dimension $n$ and $\Lambda$ is a lattice of rank $2n$ embedding in $V$, the first Chern class $c_1$ makes it possible to identify the Neron-Severi group with the group of Hermitian forms $H$ on $V$ such that

$\text{Im}H(\Lambda,\Lambda) \subseteq \mathbb{Z}$

Note that $\text{Im}H$ is an alternating integral form on the lattice $\Lambda$.

== See also ==
- Complex torus
