= Mordell–Weil theorem =

Group of K-rational points of an abelian variety

- Field: Number theory
- Conjectured by: Henri Poincaré
- Conjectured in: 1901
- First proof by: André Weil
- First proof in: 1929
- Generalizations: Faltings' theorem Bombieri–Lang conjecture Mordell–Lang conjecture

In mathematics, the Mordell–Weil theorem states that for an abelian variety $A$ over a number field $K$, the group $A(K)$ of K-rational points of $A$ is a finitely-generated abelian group, called the Mordell–Weil group. The case with $A$ an elliptic curve $E$ and $K$ the field of rational numbers is Mordell's theorem, answering a question apparently posed by Henri Poincaré around 1901; it was proven by Louis Mordell in 1922. It is a foundational theorem of Diophantine geometry and the arithmetic of abelian varieties.

== History ==
The tangent-chord process (one form of addition theorem on a cubic curve) had been known as far back as the seventeenth century. The process of infinite descent of Fermat was well known, but Mordell succeeded in establishing the finiteness of the quotient group $E(\mathbb{Q})/2E(\mathbb{Q})$ which forms a major step in the proof. Certainly the finiteness of this group is a necessary condition for $E(\mathbb{Q})$ to be finitely generated; and it shows that the rank is finite. This turns out to be the essential difficulty. It can be proved by direct analysis of the doubling of a point on E.

Some years later André Weil took up the subject, producing the generalisation to Jacobians of higher genus curves over arbitrary number fields in his doctoral dissertation published in 1928. More abstract methods were required, to carry out a proof with the same basic structure. The second half of the proof needs some type of height function, in terms of which to bound the 'size' of points of $A(K)$. Some measure of the co-ordinates will do; heights are logarithmic, so that (roughly speaking) it is a question of how many digits are required to write down a set of homogeneous coordinates. For an abelian variety, there is no a priori preferred representation, though, as a projective variety.

Both halves of the proof have been improved significantly by subsequent technical advances: in Galois cohomology as applied to descent, and in the study of the best height functions (which are quadratic forms).

== Further results ==
The theorem leaves a number of questions still unanswered:

- Calculation of the rank. This is still a demanding computational problem, and does not always have effective solutions.
- Meaning of the rank: see Birch and Swinnerton-Dyer conjecture.
- Possible torsion subgroups: Barry Mazur proved in 1978 that the Mordell–Weil group can have only finitely many torsion subgroups. This is the elliptic curve case of the torsion conjecture.
- For a curve $C$ in its Jacobian variety as $A$, can the intersection of $C$ with $A(K)$ be infinite? Faltings' theorem implies this is false unless $C = A$.
- In the same context, can $C$ contain infinitely many torsion points of $A$? Because of the Manin–Mumford conjecture, proved by Michel Raynaud, this is false unless it is the elliptic curve case.

== See also ==
- Arithmetic geometry
- Mordell–Weil group
