= Birch and Swinnerton-Dyer conjecture =

Famous open problem in mathematics

In mathematics, the Birch and Swinnerton-Dyer conjecture (often called the Birch–Swinnerton-Dyer conjecture) describes the set of rational solutions to equations defining an elliptic curve. It is an open problem in the field of number theory and is widely recognized as one of the most challenging unsolved mathematical problems. It is named after mathematicians Bryan John Birch and Sir Peter Swinnerton-Dyer, who formulated the conjecture in the 1960s with the help of machine computation. Only special cases of the conjecture have been proven.

The conjecture proposes a link between arithmetic data associated with an elliptic curve $E$ over a number field $K$ and the behaviour of its associated Hasse–Weil L-function $L(E,s)$ at $s=1$. The points $E(K)$ over a number field, for example over the rationals $\Q$, are subtle and difficult to determine, but the L-function depends only on the points modulo all prime $p$ and is much simpler: thus the conjecture is a local-to-global statement. More specifically, it is conjectured that the rank of the abelian group $E(K)$ of points of $E$ is the order of the zero of $L(E,s)$ at $s=1$, and further that the leading non-zero coefficient in the Taylor expansion of $L(E,s)$ at $s=1$ can be expressed in terms of more refined arithmetic data attached to $E$ over $K$.

The conjecture was chosen as one of the seven Millennium Prize Problems listed by the Clay Mathematics Institute, which has offered a $1,000,000 prize for the first correct proof.

== History ==
=== Background ===
In 1922, Louis J. Mordell proved Mordell's theorem, stating that the group of rational points on an elliptic curve has a finite basis. This means that for any elliptic curve, there is a finite subset of the rational points on the curve, from which all further rational points may be generated.

=== Computation ===
In the early 1960s, Peter Swinnerton-Dyer used the EDSAC-2 computer at the University of Cambridge Computer Laboratory to calculate the number $N_p$ of points modulo $p$ for a large number of primes $p$ on elliptic curves whose rank was known. From these numerical results, he and his colleague Bryan Birch conjectured that for a curve $E$ with rank $r$, the growth of $N_p$ obeys the asymptotic law
$$\prod_{p\leq x} \frac{N_p}{p} \approx C\log (x)^r$$
as $x\to \infty$, where $C$ is a constant.

Initially, this was based on somewhat tenuous trends in graphical plots, which aroused a measure of skepticism in Birch's advisor J. W. S. Cassels.

This in turn led Birch and Swinnerton-Dyer to make a general conjecture about the behavior of a curve's L-function $L(E,s)$ at $s=1$; namely, that it would have a zero of order $r$ at this point. This was a far-sighted conjecture for the time, given that the analytic continuation of $L(E,s)$ was only established for curves with complex multiplication, which were also the main source of numerical examples. (Note that the reciprocal of the L-function is from some points of view a more natural object of study; using this convention, one should consider poles rather than zeroes.)

The conjecture was subsequently extended to include the prediction of the leading Taylor coefficient of the L-function at $s=1$:
$$\frac{L^{(r)}(E,1)}{r!} = \frac{\#\mathrm{Sha}(E)\,\Omega_E R_E \prod_{p|N}c_p}{(\#E_{\mathrm{tor}})^2},$$
where $\#E_{\mathrm{tor}}$ is the order of the torsion group, $\#\mathrm{Sha}(E)=\#$Ш$(E)$ is the order of the Tate–Shafarevich group, $\Omega_E$ is the real period of $E$ multiplied by the number of connected components of $E$, $R_E$ is the regulator of $E$ (defined via the canonical heights of a basis of rational points), and $c_p$ is the Tamagawa number of $E$ at a prime $p$ dividing the conductor $N$ of $E$ (computed by Tate's algorithm).

When the conjecture was originally made, little was known, not even whether the left (analytic) side or the right (algebraic) side of this equation were even well-defined. John Tate expressed this in 1974 in a famous quote:

This remarkable conjecture relates the behavior of a function $L$ at a point where it is not at present known to be defined to the order of a group Ш which is not known to be finite!

In 2000, the Clay Mathematics Institute listed the Birch and Swinnerton-Dyer conjecture as one of its seven Millennium Prize Problems. The formulation of the conjecture as a prize problem was provided by Andrew Wiles, who explained its importance as follows:

Although there has been some success in the last fifty years in limiting the number of rational points on varieties, there are still almost no methods for finding such points. It is to be hoped that a proof of the Birch and Swinnerton-Dyer conjecture will give some insight concerning this general problem.

== Current status ==
A plot, in blue, of $\textstyle\prod_{p\leq X} N_p/p$ for the curve $y^2=x^3-5x$ as $X$ varies over the first 100000 primes. The $X$-axis is in log(log) scale ($X$ is drawn at distance proportional to $\log(\log(X))$ from 0) and the $Y$-axis is in a logarithmic scale, so the conjecture predicts that the data should tend to a line of slope equal to the rank of the curve, which is 1 in this case; that is, $\textstyle\frac{\log(\prod_{p\leq X} N_p/p)}{\log C+r\log(\log X))}\rightarrow 1$ as $X\rightarrow\infty$, with $C$, $r$ as in the text. For comparison, a line of slope 1 in (log(log),log)-scale with equation $\log y=a+\log(\log x)$ is drawn in red in the plot.

The Birch and Swinnerton-Dyer conjecture has been proved in special cases:

1. Coates and Wiles proved that if $E$ is a curve over a number field $F$ with complex multiplication by an imaginary quadratic field $K$ of class number $1$, $F=K$ or $\Q$, and $L(E,s)$ is not zero, then $E(F)$ is a finite group. This was extended to the case where $F$ is any finite abelian extension of $K$ by Arthaud.
2. Gross and Zagier showed that if a modular elliptic curve has a first-order zero at $s=1$, then it has a rational point of infinite order; see Gross–Zagier theorem.
3. Kolyvagin showed that a modular elliptic curve $E$ for which $L(E,1)$ is not zero has rank 0, and a modular elliptic curve $E$ for which $L(E,1)$ has a first-order zero at $s=1$ has rank 1.
4. Rubin showed that for elliptic curves defined over an imaginary quadratic field $K$ with complex multiplication by $K$, if the L-series of the elliptic curve was not zero at $s=1$, then the $p$-part of the Tate–Shafarevich group had the order predicted by the Birch and Swinnerton-Dyer conjecture, for all primes $p>7$.
5. Breuil et al. (2001), extending the work of Wiles, proved that all elliptic curves defined over the rational numbers are modular, which extends results #2 and #3 to all elliptic curves over the rationals, and shows that the L-functions of all elliptic curves over $\Q$ are defined at $s=1$.
6. Bhargava and Shankar proved that the average rank of the Mordell–Weil group of an elliptic curve over $\Q$ is bounded above by $7/6$. Combining this with the $p$-parity theorem of Nekovář and the work of Dokchitser and Dokchitser, and with the proof of the main conjecture of Iwasawa theory for $\operatorname{GL}(2)$ by Skinner and Urban, they conclude that a positive proportion of elliptic curves over $\Q$ have analytic rank zero, and hence, by result #3, satisfy the Birch and Swinnerton-Dyer conjecture.

There is extensive numerical evidence for the truth of the conjecture.

== Consequences ==
Much like the Riemann hypothesis, this conjecture has multiple consequences, including:

- Let n be an odd square-free integer. Assuming the Birch and Swinnerton-Dyer conjecture, n is the area of a right triangle with rational side lengths (a congruent number) if and only if the number of triplets of integers (x, y, z) satisfying 2x^{2} + y^{2} + 8z^{2} = n is twice the number of triplets satisfying 2x^{2} + y^{2} + 32z^{2} = n. This statement, due to Tunnell's theorem (Tunnell 1983), is related to the fact that n is a congruent number if and only if the elliptic curve y^{2} = x^{3} − n^{2}x has a rational point of infinite order (thus, under the Birch and Swinnerton-Dyer conjecture, its L-function has a zero at 1). The interest in this statement is that the condition is easily verified.
- In a different direction, certain analytic methods allow for an estimation of the order of zero in the center of the critical strip of families of L-functions. Admitting the BSD conjecture, these estimations correspond to information about the rank of families of elliptic curves in question. For example: suppose the generalized Riemann hypothesis and the BSD conjecture, the average rank of curves given by y^{2} = x^{3} + ax+ b is smaller than 2.
- Because of the existence of the functional equation of the L-function of an elliptic curve, BSD allows us to calculate the parity of the rank of an elliptic curve. This is a conjecture in its own right called the parity conjecture, and it relates the parity of the rank of an elliptic curve to its global root number. This leads to many explicit arithmetic phenomena which are yet to be proved unconditionally. For instance:
  - Every positive integer n ≡ 5, 6 or 7 (mod 8) is a congruent number.
  - The elliptic curve given by y^{2} = x^{3} + ax + b where a ≡ b (mod 2) has infinitely many solutions over $\mathbb{Q}(\zeta_8)$.
  - Every positive rational number d can be written in the form d = s^{2}(t^{3} – 91t – 182) for s and t in $\mathbb{Q}$.
  - For every rational number t, the elliptic curve given by y^{2} = x(x^{2} – 49(1 + t^{4})^{2}) has rank at least 1.
  - There are many more examples for elliptic curves over number fields.

== Generalizations ==
There is a version of this conjecture for general abelian varieties over number fields. A version for abelian varieties over $\mathbb{Q}$ is the following:
$$\lim_{s\to1} \frac{L(A/\mathbb Q,s)}{(s-1)^r}
= \frac{\#\mathrm{Sha}(A)\Omega_A R_A \prod_{p|N}c_p}
{\#A(\mathbb Q)_{\text{tors}}\cdot\#\hat A(\mathbb Q)_{\text{tors}}}.$$
All of the terms have the same meaning as for elliptic curves, except that the square of the order of the torsion needs to be replaced by the product $\#A(\mathbb Q)_{\text{tors}}\cdot\#\hat A(\mathbb Q)_{\text{tors}}$ involving the dual abelian variety $\hat A$. Elliptic curves as 1-dimensional abelian varieties are their own duals, i.e. $\hat E = E$, which simplifies the statement of the BSD conjecture. The regulator $R_A$ needs to be understood for the pairing between a basis for the free parts of $A(\mathbb Q)$ and $\hat A(\mathbb Q)$ relative to the Poincaré bundle on the product $A\times\hat A$.

The rank-one Birch-Swinnerton-Dyer conjecture for modular elliptic curves and modular abelian varieties of GL(2)-type over totally real number fields was proved by Shou-Wu Zhang in 2001.

Another generalization is given by the Bloch-Kato conjecture.
