= André Néron =

French mathematician

- Born: 30 November 1922; La Clayette, France
- Died: 6 April 1985 (aged 62); Paris, France
- Known for: Néron differential Néron model Néron–Severi group Néron–Tate height Néron–Ogg–Shafarevich criterion
- Awards: Émile Picard Medal (1983); ICM Speaker (1954)
- Scientific career
- Fields: Mathematics
- Workplaces: Université de Poitiers
- Doctoral advisor: Albert Châtelet
- Doctoral students: Jean-Louis Colliot-Thélène

André Néron (French pronunciation: [ɑ̃dʁe neʁɔ̃]; November 30, 1922, La Clayette, France – April 6, 1985, Paris, France) was a French mathematician at the Université de Poitiers who worked on elliptic curves and abelian varieties. He discovered the Néron minimal model of an elliptic curve or abelian variety, the Néron differential, the Néron–Severi group, the Néron–Ogg–Shafarevich criterion, the local height and Néron–Tate height of rational points on an abelian variety over a discrete valuation ring or Dedekind domain, and classified the possible fibers of an elliptic fibration.

== Life and career ==
He was a student of Albert Châtelet, and his PhD students were Jean-Louis Colliot-Thélène, Gérard Ligozat, and Dimitrios Poulakis.

He gave invited talks at the International Congress of Mathematicians in 1954 and 1966 (Néron 1956, 1968). In 1983 the Académie des sciences awarded him the Émile Picard Medal.

He died of cancer in 1985.

== Publications ==
- Néron, André (1952), "Problèmes arithmétiques et géométriques rattachés à la notion de rang d'une courbe algébrique dans un corps", Bulletin de la Société Mathématique de France, 80: 101–166, doi:10.24033/bsmf.1427, ISSN 0037-9484, MR 0056951
- Néron, André (1956), "Propriétés arithmétiques de certaines familles de courbes algébriques", Proceedings of the International Congress of Mathematicians, 1954, Amsterdam, vol. III, Erven P. Noordhoff N.V., Groningen, pp. 481–488, MR 0087210, archived from the original on 2016-09-17
- Néron, André (1964), "Modèles minimaux des variétés abéliennes sur les corps locaux et globaux", Publications Mathématiques de l'IHÉS, 21: 5–128, doi:10.1007/BF02684271, ISSN 1618-1913, MR 0179172, S2CID 120802890
- Néron, André (1968), "Degré d'intersection en géométrie diophantienne", Proceedings of International Congress of Mathematicians (Moscow, 1966), Izdat. Mir, Moscow, pp. 485–495, MR 0240097, archived from the original on 2012-03-16
