= Astérisque =

- Discipline: Mathematics
- Language: English

Publication details
- History: 1973–present
- Publisher: Société Mathématique de France
- Frequency: Irregular
- Impact factor: 0.372 (2009)

Standard abbreviations
- ISO 4: Astérisque

Indexing
- ISSN: 0303-1179
- LCCN: sf89120198

Links
- Index of recent volumes

Astérisque is a mathematical journal published by Société Mathématique de France and founded in 1973. It publishes mathematical monographs, conference reports, and the annual report of the Séminaire Nicolas Bourbaki.
