= Institut des hautes études scientifiques =

French institute for mathematics and theoretical physics

Coordinates: 48°41′42″N 2°10′09″E

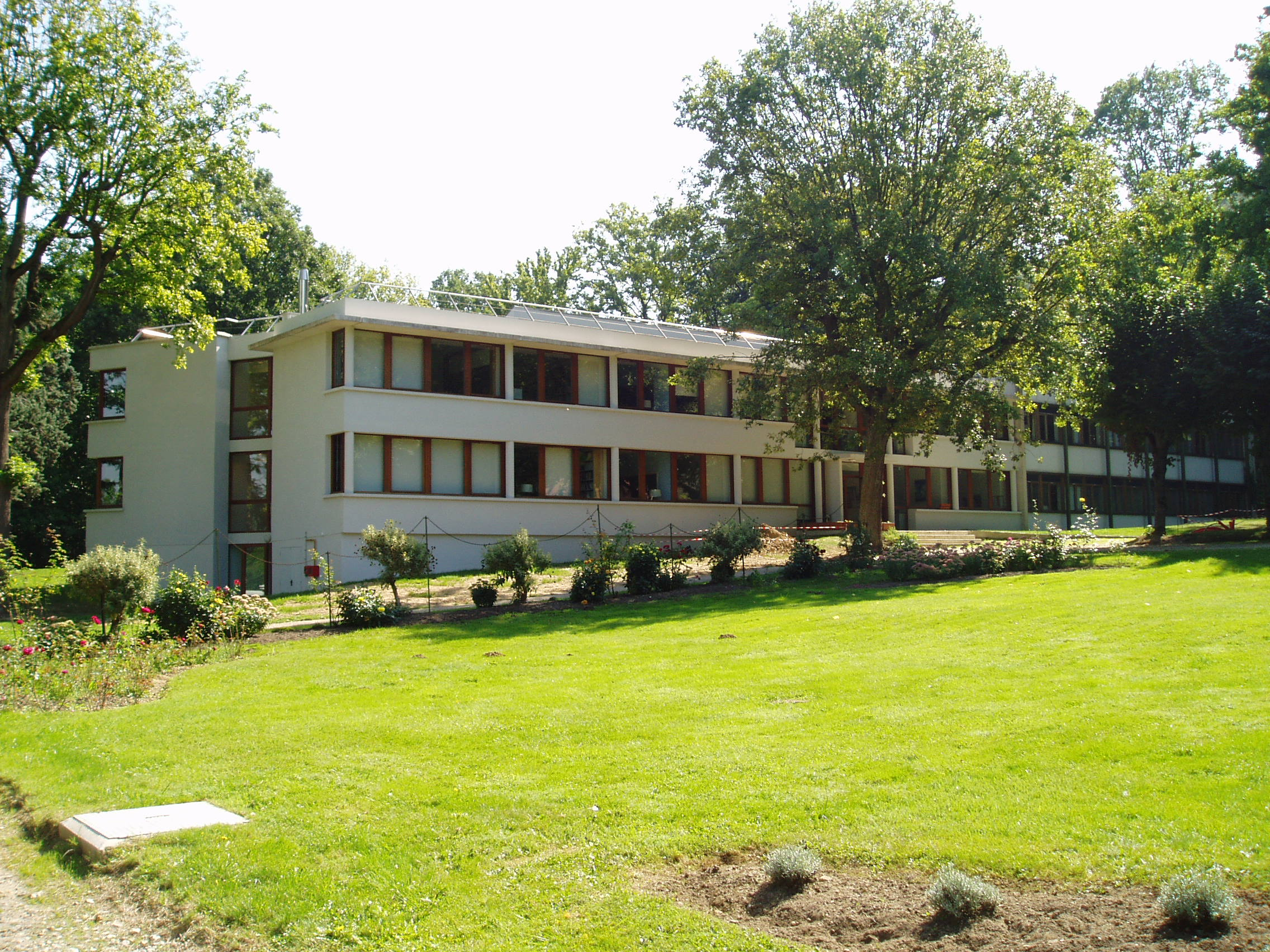
IHÉS main building

The Institut des hautes études scientifiques (IHÉS; English: Institute of Advanced Scientific Studies) is a French research institute supporting advanced research in mathematics and theoretical physics (also with a small theoretical biology group). It is located in Bures-sur-Yvette, just south of Paris. It is an independently governed research institute and a founding member of the University of Paris-Saclay.

== History ==
The IHÉS was founded in 1958 by businessman and mathematical physicist Léon Motchane with the help of Robert Oppenheimer and Jean Dieudonné as a research centre in France, modeled on the renowned Institute for Advanced Study in Princeton, United States.

IHÉS deeply draws inspiration from the model of the esteemed Institute for Advanced Study in Princeton (IAS). ... IHÉS adopted its basic characteristics – the intellectual ones – as a high level institute dedicated to basic research – and certain practical ones – such as the tradition of tea being served daily, conducive to exchanges of views. Of equal importance was the relationship between Oppenheimer and Léon Motchane (1900–1990), the founder and first director of IHÉS. As life member of the scientific committee, advisor to the director, frequent visitor and regular correspondent, Oppenheimer played a major role in the crucial early years at IHÉS. ... Oppenheimer and Motchane ... exchanged long letters and short telegrams on all aspects of life at IHÉS. ... Visits by Oppenheimer were cleverly orchestrated by Léon Motchane and reported in the press. Oppenheimer's presence was an event in itself and his coming to lHÉS gave the Institute important official recognition. Oppenheimer was to come to IHÉS three times: from 16 to 19 September 1959, on 17 and 18 October 1961 (in Bures, although the Institute had not moved there yet), and from 14 to 17 May 1963. His last visit, planned for 1965, was cancelled for health reasons.

The strong personality of Alexander Grothendieck and the broad sweep of his revolutionizing theories were a dominating feature of the first ten years at the IHÉS. René Thom received an invitation from IHÉS in 1963 and, after his appointment, remained there until his death in 2002. Dennis Sullivan is remembered as one who had a special talent for encouraging exchanges among visitors and provoking new and deeper insights into their ideas.

The IHÉS runs a highly regarded mathematical journal, Publications Mathématiques de l'IHÉS.

IHÉS celebrated its 40th anniversary in 1998 and its 50th in 2008.

== Directors ==
Image	Name	Timespan
	Léon Motchane	(1958–1971)
	Nicolaas Kuiper	(1971–1985)
	Marcel Berger	(1985–1994)
	Jean-Pierre Bourguignon	(1994–2013)
	Emmanuel Ullmo	(2013–present)

== List of IHES permanent professors ==
Name	Nationality	Field	Year joined	Year left	Notes	Major awards
Alexander Grothendieck	Stateless	mathematician	1958	1970		Fields Medal (1966), Crafoord Prize (1988)
Jean Dieudonné	French	mathematician	1958	1964		
Louis Michel	French	physicist	1962	1992	Emeritus 1992–1999	Wigner Medal (1982)
René Thom	French	mathematician	1963	1990	Emeritus 1990–2002	Fields Medal (1958)
David Ruelle	Belgian	physicist	1964	2000	Emeritus since 2000	Henri Poincaré Prize (2006), Max Planck Medal (2014)
Pierre Deligne	Belgian	mathematician	1970	1984		Fields Medal (1978), Crafoord Prize (1988), Abel Prize (2013)
Dennis Sullivan	American	mathematician	1974	1997		Wolf Prize (2010), Abel Prize (2022)
Jürg Fröhlich	Swiss	physicist	1978	1982		Max-Planck Medal (2001), Henri Poincaré Prize (2009)
Oscar Lanford III	American	physicist	1982	1989		
Mikhaïl Gromov	Russian, French	mathematician	1982	2015	Emeritus since 2015	Wolf Prize (1993), Abel Prize (2009)
Jean Bourgain	Belgian	mathematician	1985	1994		Fields Medal (1994), Shaw Prize (2010), Crafoord Prize (2012)
Thibault Damour	French	physicist	1989	2022	Emeritus since 2022	Albert Einstein Medal (1996), CNRS Gold Medal (2017)
Maxim Kontsevich	Russian, French	mathematician	1995	current		Henri Poincaré Prize (1997), Fields Medal (1998), Crafoord Prize (2008), Shaw Prize (2012)
Laurent Lafforgue	French	mathematician	2000	2021		Fields Medal (2002)
Nikita Nekrasov	Russian	physicist	2000	2013		Hermann Weyl Prize (2004), Jacques Herbrand Prize (2004), Compositio Prize (2009)
Vasily Pestun	Russian	physicist	2014	2023		Hermann Weyl Prize (2016)
Hugo Duminil-Copin	French	mathematician	2016	current		Fields Medal (2022)
Slava Rychkov	Russian, Italian, French	physicist	2017	current		New Horizons in Physics Prize (2014), Mergier-Bourdeix Prize (2019)
Laure Saint-Raymond	French	mathematician	2021	current		
Dustin Clausen	Canadian, American	mathematician	2023	current		
Julio Parra-Martinez	Spanish	physicist	2024	current		
Hong Wang	Chinese	mathematician	2025	current		Maryam Mirzakhani New Frontiers Prize (2022), Fields Medal (2026)

== Scientists associated with the IHES ==
Alain Connes (Fields Medal 1982) has held the Léon Motchane Chair since 1979. Several CNRS researchers are also based at the IHES: Ahmed Abbes, Thierry Baudineau, Ofer Gabber, Fanny Kassel and Christophe Soulé in mathematics and Clément Delcamp in physics. Yilin Wang is a junior professor.
