= Néron model =

Mathematical model

In algebraic geometry, the Néron model (or Néron minimal model, or minimal model) for an abelian variety A_{K} defined over the field of fractions K of a Dedekind domain R is the "push-forward" of A_{K} from Spec(K) to Spec(R), in other words the "best possible" group scheme A_{R} defined over R corresponding to A_{K}.

They were introduced by André Néron (1961, 1964) for abelian varieties over the quotient field of a Dedekind domain R with perfect residue fields, and Raynaud (1966) extended this construction to semiabelian varieties over all Dedekind domains.

== Definition ==
Suppose that R is a Dedekind domain with field of fractions K, and suppose that A_{K} is a smooth separated scheme over K (such as an abelian variety). Then a Néron model of A_{K} is defined to be a smooth separated scheme A_{R} over R with fiber A_{K} that is universal in the following sense.

If X is a smooth separated scheme over R then any K-morphism from X_{K} to A_{K} can be extended to a unique R-morphism from X to A_{R} (Néron mapping property).

In particular, the canonical map $A_R(R)\to A_K(K)$ is an isomorphism. If a Néron model exists then it is unique up to unique isomorphism.

In terms of sheaves, any scheme A over Spec(K) represents a sheaf on the category of schemes smooth over Spec(K) with the smooth Grothendieck topology, and this has a pushforward by the injection map from Spec(K) to Spec(R), which is a sheaf over Spec(R). If this pushforward is representable by a scheme, then this scheme is the Néron model of A.

In general the scheme A_{K} need not have any Néron model. For abelian varieties A_{K} Néron models exist and are unique (up to unique isomorphism) and are commutative quasi-projective group schemes over R. The fiber of a Néron model over a closed point of Spec(R) is a smooth commutative algebraic group, but need not be an abelian variety: for example, it may be disconnected or a torus. Néron models exist as well for certain commutative groups other than abelian varieties such as tori, but these are only locally of finite type. Néron models do not exist for the additive group.

== Properties ==
- The formation of Néron models commutes with products.
- The formation of Néron models commutes with étale base change.
- An Abelian scheme A_{R} is the Néron model of its generic fibre.

== The Néron model of an elliptic curve ==
The Néron model of an elliptic curve A_{K} over K can be constructed as follows. First form the minimal model over R in the sense of algebraic (or arithmetic) surfaces. This is a regular proper surface over R but is not in general smooth over R or a group scheme over R. Its subscheme of smooth points over R is the Néron model, which is a smooth group scheme over R but not necessarily proper over R. The fibers in general may have several irreducible components, and to form the Néron model one discards all multiple components, all points where two components intersect, and all singular points of the components.

Tate's algorithm calculates the special fiber of the Néron model of an elliptic curve, or more precisely the fibers of the minimal surface containing the Néron model.

== See also ==
- Minimal model program
