= Arithmetic geometry =

Branch of algebraic geometry

The hyperelliptic curve defined by y^{2} = x(x + 1)(x − 3)(x + 2)(x − 2) has only finitely many rational points (such as the points (−2, 0) and (−1, 0)) by Faltings' theorem.

In mathematics, arithmetic geometry is roughly the application of techniques from algebraic geometry to problems in number theory. Arithmetic geometry is centered around Diophantine geometry, the study of rational points of algebraic varieties.

In more abstract terms, arithmetic geometry can be defined as the study of schemes of finite type over the spectrum of the ring of integers.

== Overview ==
The classical objects of interest in arithmetic geometry are rational points: sets of solutions of a system of polynomial equations over number fields, finite fields, p-adic fields, or function fields, i.e. fields that are not algebraically closed excluding the real numbers. Rational points can be directly characterized by height functions which measure their arithmetic complexity.

The structure of algebraic varieties defined over non-algebraically closed fields has become a central area of interest that arose with the modern abstract development of algebraic geometry. Over finite fields, étale cohomology provides topological invariants associated to algebraic varieties. p-adic Hodge theory gives tools to examine when cohomological properties of varieties over the complex numbers extend to those over p-adic fields.

== History ==
=== 19th century: early arithmetic geometry ===
In the early 19th century, Carl Friedrich Gauss observed that non-zero integer solutions to homogeneous polynomial equations with rational coefficients exist if non-zero rational solutions exist.

In the 1850s, Leopold Kronecker formulated the Kronecker–Weber theorem, introduced the theory of divisors, and made numerous other connections between number theory and algebra. He then conjectured his "liebster Jugendtraum" ("dearest dream of youth"), a generalization that was later put forward by Hilbert in a modified form as his twelfth problem, which outlines a goal to have number theory operate only with rings that are quotients of polynomial rings over the integers.

=== Early-to-mid 20th century: algebraic developments and the Weil conjectures ===
In the late 1920s, André Weil demonstrated profound connections between algebraic geometry and number theory with his doctoral work leading to the Mordell–Weil theorem which demonstrates that the set of rational points of an abelian variety is a finitely generated abelian group.

Modern foundations of algebraic geometry were developed based on contemporary commutative algebra, including valuation theory and the theory of ideals by Oscar Zariski and others in the 1930s and 1940s.

In 1949, André Weil posed the landmark Weil conjectures about the local zeta-functions of algebraic varieties over finite fields. These conjectures offered a framework between algebraic geometry and number theory that propelled Alexander Grothendieck to recast the foundations making use of sheaf theory (together with Jean-Pierre Serre), and later scheme theory, in the 1950s and 1960s. Bernard Dwork proved one of the four Weil conjectures (rationality of the local zeta function) in 1960. Grothendieck developed étale cohomology theory to prove two of the Weil conjectures (together with Michael Artin and Jean-Louis Verdier) by 1965. The last of the Weil conjectures (an analogue of the Riemann hypothesis) would be finally proven in 1974 by Pierre Deligne.

=== Mid-to-late 20th century: developments in modularity, p-adic methods, and beyond ===
Between 1956 and 1957, Yutaka Taniyama and Goro Shimura posed the Taniyama–Shimura conjecture (now known as the modularity theorem) relating elliptic curves to modular forms. This connection would ultimately lead to the first proof of Fermat's Last Theorem in number theory through algebraic geometry techniques of modularity lifting developed by Andrew Wiles in 1995.

In the 1960s, Goro Shimura introduced Shimura varieties as generalizations of modular curves. Since the 1979, Shimura varieties have played a crucial role in the Langlands program as a natural realm of examples for testing conjectures.

In papers in 1977 and 1978, Barry Mazur proved the torsion conjecture giving a complete list of the possible torsion subgroups of elliptic curves over the rational numbers. Mazur's first proof of this theorem depended upon a complete analysis of the rational points on certain modular curves. In 1996, the proof of the torsion conjecture was extended to all number fields by Loïc Merel.

In 1983, Gerd Faltings proved the Mordell conjecture, demonstrating that a curve of genus greater than 1 has only finitely many rational points (where the Mordell–Weil theorem only demonstrates finite generation of the set of rational points as opposed to finiteness).

=== Early 21st century ===
In 2001, the proof of the local Langlands conjectures for GL_{n} was based on the geometry of certain Shimura varieties.

In the 2010s, Peter Scholze developed perfectoid spaces and new cohomology theories in arithmetic geometry over p-adic fields with application to Galois representations and certain cases of the weight-monodromy conjecture.

== See also ==
- Anabelian geometry
- Arithmetic dynamics
- Arithmetic of abelian varieties
- Birch and Swinnerton-Dyer conjecture
- Category theory
- Frobenioid
- Moduli of algebraic curves
- Siegel modular variety
- Siegel's theorem on integral points
