= Height function =

Mathematical functions that quantify complexity

A height function is a function that quantifies the complexity of mathematical objects. In Diophantine geometry, height functions quantify the size of solutions to Diophantine equations and are typically functions from a set of points on algebraic varieties (or a set of algebraic varieties) to the real numbers.

For instance, the classical or naive height over the rational numbers is typically defined to be the maximum of the numerators and denominators of the coordinates (e.g. 7 for the coordinates (3/7, 1/2)), but in a logarithmic scale.

== Significance ==
Height functions allow mathematicians to count objects, such as rational points, that are otherwise infinite in quantity. For instance, the set of rational numbers of naive height (the maximum of the numerator and denominator when expressed in lowest terms) below any given constant is finite despite the set of rational numbers being infinite. In this sense, height functions can be used to prove asymptotic results such as Baker's theorem in transcendental number theory which was proved by Alan Baker (1966, 1967a, 1967b).

In other cases, height functions can distinguish some objects based on their complexity. For instance, the subspace theorem proved by Wolfgang M. Schmidt (1972) demonstrates that points of small height (i.e. small complexity) in projective space lie in a finite number of hyperplanes and generalizes Siegel's theorem on integral points and solution of the S-unit equation.

Height functions were crucial to the proofs of the Mordell–Weil theorem and Faltings' theorem by Weil (1929) and Faltings (1983) respectively. Several outstanding unsolved problems about the heights of rational points on algebraic varieties, such as the Manin conjecture and Vojta's conjecture, have far-reaching implications for problems in Diophantine approximation, Diophantine equations, arithmetic geometry, and mathematical logic.

== History ==
An early form of height function was proposed by Giambattista Benedetti (c. 1563), who argued that the consonance of a musical interval could be measured by the product of its numerator and denominator (in reduced form); see Giambattista Benedetti § Music.

Heights in Diophantine geometry were initially developed by André Weil and Douglas Northcott beginning in the 1920s. Innovations in 1960s were the Néron–Tate height and the realization that heights were linked to projective representations in much the same way that ample line bundles are in other parts of algebraic geometry. In the 1970s, Suren Arakelov developed Arakelov heights in Arakelov theory. In 1983, Faltings developed his theory of Faltings heights in his proof of Faltings' theorem.

== Height functions in Diophantine geometry ==
=== Naive height ===
Classical or naive height is defined in terms of ordinary absolute value on homogeneous coordinates. It is typically a logarithmic scale and therefore can be viewed as being proportional to the "algebraic complexity" or number of bits needed to store a point. It is typically defined to be the logarithm of the maximum absolute value of the vector of coprime integers obtained by multiplying through by a lowest common denominator. This may be used to define height on a point in projective space over Q, or of a polynomial, regarded as a vector of coefficients, or of an algebraic number, from the height of its minimal polynomial.

The naive height of a rational number x = p/q (in lowest terms) is

- multiplicative height $H(p/q) = \max\{|p|,|q|\}$
- logarithmic height: $h(p/q) = \log H (p/q)$

Therefore, the naive multiplicative and logarithmic heights of 4/10 are 5 and log(5), for example.

The naive height H of an elliptic curve E given by y^{2} = x^{3} + Ax + B is defined to be H(E) = log max(4|A|^{3}, 27|B|^{2}).

=== Néron–Tate height ===
The Néron–Tate height, or canonical height, is a quadratic form on the Mordell–Weil group of rational points of an abelian variety defined over a global field. It is named after André Néron, who first defined it as a sum of local heights, and John Tate, who defined it globally in an unpublished work.

=== Weil height ===
Let X be a projective variety over a number field K. Let L be a line bundle on X. One defines the Weil height on X with respect to L as follows.

First, suppose that L is very ample. A choice of basis of the space $\Gamma(X,L)$ of global sections defines a morphism ϕ from X to projective space, and for all points p on X, one defines $h_L(p) := h(\phi(p))$, where h is the naive height on projective space. For fixed X and L, choosing a different basis of global sections changes $h_L$, but only by a bounded function of p. Thus $h_L$ is well-defined up to addition of a function that is O(1).

In general, one can write L as the difference of two very ample line bundles L_{1} and L_{2} on X and define $h_{L} := h_{L_1} - h_{L_2},$ which again is well-defined up to O(1).

==== Arakelov height ====
The Arakelov height on a projective space over the field of algebraic numbers is a global height function with local contributions coming from Fubini–Study metrics on the Archimedean fields and the usual metric on the non-Archimedean fields. It is the usual Weil height equipped with a different metric.

=== Faltings height ===
The Faltings height of an abelian variety defined over a number field is a measure of its arithmetic complexity. It is defined in terms of the height of a metrized line bundle. It was introduced by Faltings (1983) in his proof of the Mordell conjecture.

== Height functions in algebra ==
=== Height of a polynomial ===
For a polynomial P of degree n given by

$$P = a_0 + a_1 x + a_2 x^2 + \cdots + a_n x^n ,$$

the height H(P) is defined to be the maximum of the magnitudes of its coefficients:

$$H(P) = \underset{i}{\max} \,|a_i|.$$

One could similarly define the length L(P) as the sum of the magnitudes of the coefficients:

$$L(P) = \sum_{i=0}^n |a_i|.$$

==== Relation to Mahler measure ====
The Mahler measure M(P) of P is also a measure of the complexity of P. The three functions H(P), L(P) and M(P) are related by the inequalities

$$\binom{n}{\lfloor n/2 \rfloor}^{-1} H(P) \le M(P) \le H(P) \sqrt{n+1} ;$$

$$L(p) \le 2^n M(p) \le 2^n L(p) ;$$

$$H(p) \le L(p) \le (n+1) H(p)$$

where $\scriptstyle \binom{n}{\lfloor n/2 \rfloor}$ is the binomial coefficient.

== Height functions in automorphic forms ==
One of the conditions in the definition of an automorphic form on the general linear group of an adelic algebraic group is moderate growth, which is an asymptotic condition on the growth of a height function on the general linear group viewed as an affine variety.

== Other height functions ==
The height of an irreducible rational number x = p/q, q > 0 is $|p|+q$ (this function is used for constructing a bijection between $\mathbb{N}$ and $\mathbb{Q}$).

== See also ==
- abc conjecture
- Birch and Swinnerton-Dyer conjecture
- Elliptic Lehmer conjecture
- Heath-Brown–Moroz constant
- Height of a formal group law
- Height zeta function
- Raynaud's isogeny theorem

== Sources ==
- Baker, Alan (1966). "Linear forms in the logarithms of algebraic numbers. I". Mathematika. 13 (2): 204–216. doi:10.1112/S0025579300003971. ISSN 0025-5793. MR 0220680.
- Baker, Alan (1967a). "Linear forms in the logarithms of algebraic numbers. II". Mathematika. 14: 102–107. doi:10.1112/S0025579300008068. ISSN 0025-5793. MR 0220680.
- Baker, Alan (1967b). "Linear forms in the logarithms of algebraic numbers. III". Mathematika. 14 (2): 220–228. doi:10.1112/S0025579300003843. ISSN 0025-5793. MR 0220680.
- Baker, Alan; Wüstholz, Gisbert (2007). Logarithmic Forms and Diophantine Geometry. New Mathematical Monographs. Vol. 9. Cambridge University Press. p. 3. ISBN 978-0-521-88268-2. Zbl 1145.11004.
- Bombieri, Enrico; Gubler, Walter (2006). Heights in Diophantine Geometry. New Mathematical Monographs. Vol. 4. Cambridge University Press. ISBN 978-0-521-71229-3. Zbl 1130.11034.
- Borwein, Peter (2002). Computational Excursions in Analysis and Number Theory. CMS Books in Mathematics. Springer-Verlag. pp. 2, 3, 14148. ISBN 0-387-95444-9. Zbl 1020.12001.
- Bump, Daniel (1998). Automorphic Forms and Representations. Cambridge Studies in Advanced Mathematics. Vol. 55. Cambridge University Press. p. 300. ISBN 9780521658188.
- Cornell, Gary; Silverman, Joseph H. (1986). Arithmetic geometry. New York: Springer. ISBN 0387963111. → Contains an English translation of Faltings (1983)
- Faltings, Gerd (1983). "Endlichkeitssätze für abelsche Varietäten über Zahlkörpern" [Finiteness theorems for abelian varieties over number fields]. Inventiones Mathematicae (in German). 73 (3): 349–366. Bibcode:1983InMat..73..349F. doi:10.1007/BF01388432. MR 0718935. S2CID 121049418.
- Faltings, Gerd (1991). "Diophantine approximation on abelian varieties". Annals of Mathematics. 123 (3): 549–576. doi:10.2307/2944319. JSTOR 2944319. MR 1109353.
- Fili, Paul; Petsche, Clayton; Pritsker, Igor (2017). "Energy integrals and small points for the Arakelov height". Archiv der Mathematik. 109 (5): 441–454. arXiv:1507.01900. doi:10.1007/s00013-017-1080-x. S2CID 119161942.
- Mahler, K. (1963). "On two extremum properties of polynomials". Illinois Journal of Mathematics. 7 (4): 681–701. doi:10.1215/ijm/1255645104. Zbl 0117.04003.
- Néron, André (1965). "Quasi-fonctions et hauteurs sur les variétés abéliennes". Annals of Mathematics (in French). 82 (2): 249–331. doi:10.2307/1970644. JSTOR 1970644. MR 0179173.
- Schinzel, Andrzej (2000). Polynomials with special regard to reducibility. Encyclopedia of Mathematics and Its Applications. Vol. 77. Cambridge: Cambridge University Press. p. 212. ISBN 0-521-66225-7. Zbl 0956.12001.
- Schmidt, Wolfgang M. (1972). "Norm form equations". Annals of Mathematics. Second Series. 96 (3): 526–551. doi:10.2307/1970824. JSTOR 1970824. MR 0314761.
- Lang, Serge (1988). Introduction to Arakelov theory. New York: Springer-Verlag. ISBN 0-387-96793-1. MR 0969124. Zbl 0667.14001.
- Lang, Serge (1997). Survey of Diophantine Geometry. Springer-Verlag. ISBN 3-540-61223-8. Zbl 0869.11051.
- Weil, André (1929). "L'arithmétique sur les courbes algébriques". Acta Mathematica. 52 (1): 281–315. doi:10.1007/BF02592688. MR 1555278.
- Silverman, Joseph H. (1994). Advanced Topics in the Arithmetic of Elliptic Curves. New York: Springer. ISBN 978-1-4612-0851-8.
- Vojta, Paul (1987). Diophantine Approximations and Value Distribution Theory. Lecture Notes in Mathematics. Vol. 1239. Berlin, New York: Springer-Verlag. doi:10.1007/BFb0072989. ISBN 978-3-540-17551-3. MR 0883451. Zbl 0609.14011.
- Kolmogorov, Andrey; Fomin, Sergei (1957). Elements of the Theory of Functions and Functional Analysis. New York: Graylock Press.
