= Hans Peter Schlickewei =

German mathematician

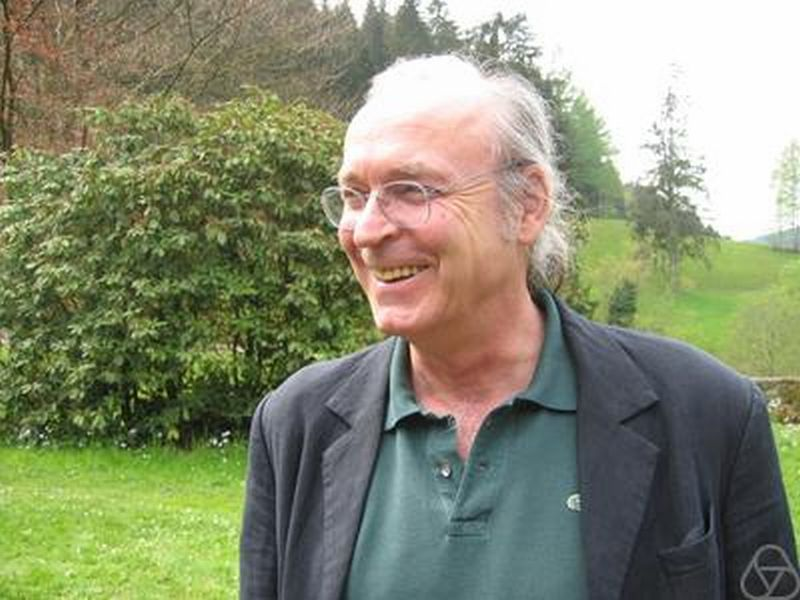
Hans Peter Schlickewei, Oberwolfach 2007

Hans Peter Schlickewei (born 1947) is a German mathematician, specializing in number theory and, in particular, the theory of transcendental numbers.

Schlickewei received his doctorate in 1975 at the University of Freiburg under the supervision of Theodor Schneider. Schlickewei is a professor at the University of Marburg.

He proved in 1976 the p-adic generalization of the subspace theorem of Wolfgang M. Schmidt. Schlickewei's theorem implies the Thue-Siegel-Roth theorem, whose p-adic analogue was already proved in 1958 by David Ridout.

In 1998, Schlickewei was an invited speaker with talk The Subspace Theorem and Applications at the International Congress of Mathematicians in Berlin.

== Selected publications ==
- Schlickewei, H. P. (1976). "Die p-adische Verallgemeinerung des Satzes von Thue-Siegel-Roth-Schmidt". J. Reine Angew. Math. 1976 (288): 86–105. doi:10.1515/crll.1976.288.86. S2CID 115523021.
- Schinzel, A.; Schlickewei, H.; Schmidt, W. (1980). "Small solutions of quadratic congruences and small fractional parts of quadratic forms". Acta Arithmetica. 37 (1): 241–248. doi:10.4064/aa-37-1-241-248.
- Schlickewei, H. P. (1990). "S-unit equations over number fields". Invent. Math. 102: 95–107. Bibcode:1990InMat.102...95S. doi:10.1007/BF01233421. S2CID 120614908.
- Van Der Poorten, A. J.; Schlickewei, H. P. (1991). "Additive relations in fields". Journal of the Australian Mathematical Society, Series A. 51: 154–170. doi:10.1017/S144678870003336X.
- Schlickewei, H. P. (1993). "Multiplicities of algebraic linear recurrrences". Acta Mathematica. 170 (2): 151–180. doi:10.1007/BF02392784.
- Schlickewei, H. P. (1996). "Multiplicities of recurrence sequences". Acta Mathematica. 176 (2): 171–243. doi:10.1007/BF02551582.
- Schlickewei, H. P. (1997). "The multiplicity of binary recurrences". Invent. Math. 129 (11): 11–36. Bibcode:1997InMat.129...11S. doi:10.1007/s002220050156. S2CID 121677668.
- Schlickewei, H. P.; Schmidt, W. P. (2000). "The number of solutions of polynomial-exponential equations". Compositio Math. 120 (2): 193–225. doi:10.1023/A:1001719425893. S2CID 123405472.
- Evertse, J.-H.; Schlickewei, H. P.; Schmidt, W. M. (2002). "Linear Equations in Variables which Lie in a Multiplicative Group". The Annals of Mathematics. 155 (3): 807. arXiv:math/0409604. doi:10.2307/3062133. JSTOR 3062133. S2CID 5727031.
- Approximation of algebraic numbers, pp. 107–170 in: D. Masser, Yu. V. Nesterenko, W. Schmidt, M. Waldschmidt (eds.): Diophantine Approximation, Lectures CIME Summer School 2000, Springer 2003
