= Ziyang Gao =

Chinese mathematician (born 1986)

- Born: 1988 (age 37–38); China
- Education: Peking University (BSc 2010); Université Paris-Sud and Leiden University (PhD 2015)
- Awards: Stieljtes Prize (2015); David Goss Prize (2022); Frontiers Science Award (2024); Compositio Prize (2025)
- Scientific career
- Fields: Mathematics
- Thesis: The mixed Ax–Lindemann theorem and its applications to the Zilber–Pink conjecture (2015)
- Doctoral advisor: Bas Edixhoven; Emmanuel Ullmo

Ziyang Gao (Chinese: 高紫阳; pinyin: Gāo Zǐyáng) is a Chinese mathematician. He is a professor at the University of California, Los Angeles. His research concerns arithmetic geometry, Diophantine geometry, Shimura varieties and transcendental number theory.

In 2022, along with Vesselin Dimitrov, Gao won the David Goss Prize for his work on Shimura varieties and Diophantine geometry. His work on the uniform Mordell conjecture, joint with Vesselin Dimitrov and Philipp Habegger is considered a major breakthrough in diophantine geometry and is the resolution of a 40-year old conjecture.

== Career ==
Gao received his Bachelor of Science in mathematics from Peking University in 2010 and his PhD from Université Paris-Sud and Leiden University in 2015, under the supervision of Emmanuel Ullmo and Bas Edixhoven. He was a member at the Institute of Advanced Study in 2015 and an Instructor at Princeton University from 2016 to 2018. From 2015 to 2021, he also worked as a researcher at CNRS. In 2021, he took up an appointment as a W3 professor in Leibniz University Hannover. As of 2024, he is a professor at the University of California, Los Angeles.

== Research ==
Gao extended results of Edixhoven, Bruno Klingler, Ullmo and Andrei Yafaev, and of Jonathan Pila, Jacob Tsimerman and Umberto Zannier from Shimura varieties to mixed Shimura varieties, thereby extending Tsimerman's work on the Andre-Oort conjecture to mixed Shimura varieties.

In joint work with Habegger, Gao resolved the geometric Bogomolov conjecture for function fields of curves in characteristic zero. Together with Dimitrov and Habegger, Gao proved a uniform version of the Mordell conjecture (also known as Faltings' theorem), thereby proving Mazur's Conjecture B. The uniform Mordell conjecture is considered a major breakthrough in diophantine geometry and is the resolution of a 40-year old conjecture. With Tangli Ge and Lars Kühne, Gao extended his result on uniform Mordell from curves in Jacobians to subvarieties of abelian varieties, hence proving a uniform version of the Mordell-Lang conjecture. Together with Habegger, Gao also proved the relative Manin-Mumford conjecture.

== Awards ==
- In 2015, the Stieljtes prize for his PhD dissertation.
- In 2022, along with Vesselin Dimitrov, the David Goss Prize for his work on Shimura varieties and Diophantine geometry, which is awarded every two years to outstanding mathematicians below the age of 35 for their contributions to number theory.
- In 2024 the Frontiers in Science award for his joint paper with Dimitrov and Philipp Habegger on the uniform Mordell conjecture.
- In 2025 the Compositio prize for his paper titled "Generic rank of Betti map and unlikely intersections".
