= Schmidt's theorem =

Schmidt's theorem may refer to:

- Krull–Schmidt theorem
- Wolfgang M. Schmidt's subspace theorem
