= Bas Edixhoven =

Dutch mathematician (1962–2022)

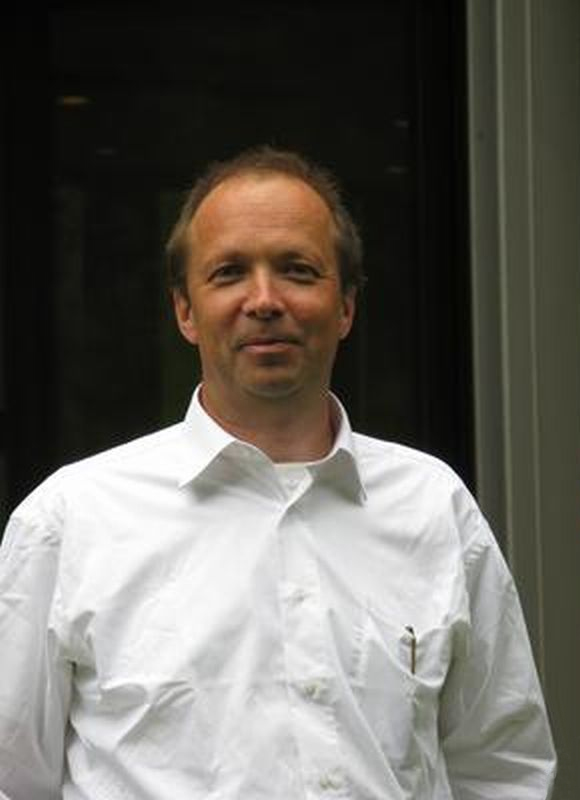
- Edixhoven in 2008
- Born: Sebastiaan Johan Edixhoven; 12 March 1962; Leiden, Netherlands
- Died: 16 January 2022 (aged 59)
- Education: Utrecht University
- Scientific career
- Fields: Mathematics
- Workplaces: Leiden University; University of Rennes 1
- Thesis: Stable Models of Modular Curves and Applications (1989)
- Doctoral advisor: Frans Oort
- Doctoral students: Andrei Yafaev; Ziyang Gao

Sebastiaan Johan Edixhoven (12 March 1962 – 16 January 2022) was a Dutch mathematician who worked in arithmetic geometry. He was a professor at University of Rennes 1 and Leiden University.

== Education ==
Bas Edixhoven was born on 12 March 1962 in Leiden, Netherlands. Edixhoven graduated from Erasmus College in Zoetermeer in 1980. He then studied at Utrecht University where he graduated with a master's degree in pure mathematics cum laude in 1985 and a PhD in mathematics in 1989, both under the direction of Frans Oort. His thesis was about modular curves.

== Career ==
Edixhoven was a Morrey assistant professor at the University of California, Berkeley from 1989 to 1991, after which he returned to Utrecht University. From 1992 to 2002, he was a professor at the University of Rennes 1. He moved to Leiden University as a professor of geometry in 2002.

In 2004, Edixhoven and Peter Stevenhagen established Leiden's participation in the Algebra, Geometry and Number Theory (ALGANT) collaborative program for master's and PhD students across French, Italian, German, Canadian, and Dutch universities.

Edixhoven was a co-managing editor of Compositio Mathematica from 2003 to 2012. He was an editor for Compositio Mathematica from 2000 to 2012, for the Journal de Théorie des Nombres de Bordeaux from 1998 to 2004, for the Journal of Number Theory from 2004 to 2012, for Expositiones Mathematicae from 2003 to 2022, and for Indagationes Mathematicae from 2010 to 2022.

Edixhoven was involved in the Bèta-lerarenkamer think tank, which produced a mobile app for refugee teachers to improve their Dutch and mathematics abilities.

== Research ==
Edixhoven's early work was on modular curves. He worked on the techniques used in Wiles's proof of Fermat's Last Theorem and the proof of Serre's modularity conjecture.

He later made important contributions regarding the André–Oort conjecture, as well as making modular forms and associated Galois representations more computationally accessible. His latest works had focused on geometric interpretations of the quadratic Chabauty method.

Outside of academia, he worked on correction codes for the French Ministry of Defense and Canon Inc.

== Awards ==
From 1989 to 1992, Edixhoven was a recipient of the Huygens scholarship. From 1995 to 2002, he was a member of the Institut Universitaire de France. In 2009, he became a member of the Royal Netherlands Academy of Arts and Sciences. In 2008, he gave an invited lecture at the 5th European Congress of Mathematics.

== Death ==
Edixhoven died on 16 January 2022, at the age of 59, from a tumor.

== Selected publications ==
- Edixhoven, Bas (1992). "The weight in Serre's conjectures on modular forms". Inventiones Mathematicae. 109 (1): 563–594. Bibcode:1992InMat.109..563E. doi:10.1007/BF01232041. ISSN 0020-9910. S2CID 120195693.
- Edixhoven, Bas (1997). "Serre's conjecture". In Cornell, Gary; Silverman, Joseph H.; Stevens, Glenn (eds.). Modular Forms and Fermat's Last Theorem. New York, NY: Springer New York. pp. 209–242. doi:10.1007/978-1-4612-1974-3. ISBN 978-0-387-98998-3.
- Edixhoven, Bas; Yafaev, Andrei (2003). "Subvarieties of Shimura varieties". Annals of Mathematics. 157 (2): 621–645. arXiv:math/0105241. doi:10.4007/annals.2003.157.621. ISSN 0003-486X. S2CID 15256637.
- Edixhoven, Bas (2005). "Special points on products of modular curves". Duke Mathematical Journal. 126 (2). arXiv:math/0302138. doi:10.1215/S0012-7094-04-12624-7. ISSN 0012-7094. S2CID 16531430.
- de Jong, Robin; Merkl, Franz; Bosman, Johan (2011). Edixhoven, Bas; Couveignes, Jean-Marc (eds.). Computational Aspects of Modular Forms and Galois Representations: How One Can Compute in Polynomial Time the Value of Ramanujan's Tau at a Prime (AM-176) (1 ed.). Princeton University Press. arXiv:math/0605244. doi:10.23943/princeton/9780691142012.001.0001. ISBN 978-0-691-14201-2.
