= Pietro Corvaja =

Italian mathematician

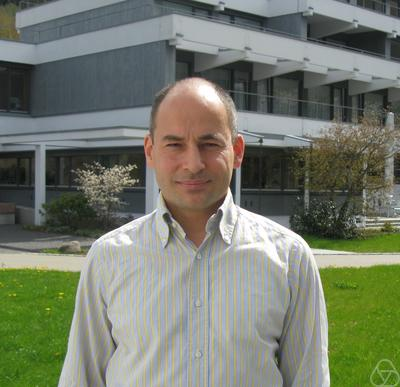
- Corvaja at the Mathematical Research Institute of Oberwolfach in 2012
- Born: 19 July 1967 (age 59); Padua, Italy
- Education: Pierre and Marie Curie University; Scuola Normale Superiore di Pisa; University of Pisa
- Scientific career
- Fields: Mathematics
- Workplaces: University of Udine
- Thesis: Approximation diophantienne sur la droite (1995)
- Doctoral advisor: Michel Waldschmidt; Michel Laurent

Pietro Corvaja (born 19 July 1967 in Padua, Italy) is an Italian mathematician working in Diophantine geometry. He is a professor of geometry at the University of Udine.

== Early life and education ==
Corvaja was born in Padua, Italy on 19 July 1967. He graduated with a scientific high school diploma from a liceo scientifico in 1985, before enrolling in the University of Pisa as a student of the Scuola Normale Superiore di Pisa. He graduated from the Scuola Normale with an undergraduate thesis on the theory of transcendental numbers under the direction of Roberto Dvornicich in 1989.

After a one year scholarship at INdAM from 1989 to 1990, Corvaja completed his PhD under Michel Waldschmidt and Michel Laurent at Pierre and Marie Curie University in 1995. From 1994 to 1995, he was also a research assistant at the Università Iuav di Venezia as a collaborator of Umberto Zannier. In 2001, Corvaja obtained his habilitation qualification at Pierre and Marie Curie University.

== Career ==
In 1995, Corvaja became a researcher at the University of Udine. From 1997 to 1998, he was a member of the Institute for Advanced Study under the direction of Enrico Bombieri. In 2002, Corvaja became an associate professor of algebra at the University of Udine. Since 2005, he has been a professor of geometry at the University of Udine.

Corvaja is the coordinator of the mathematics program and the vice director of the Scuola Superiore (School of Excellence) of the University of Udine.

== Research ==
Corvaja and Zannier gave a new proof of Siegel's theorem on integral points in 2002 by using a new method based on the subspace theorem.

== Awards ==
Corvaja was inducted into the Istituto Veneto di Scienze, Lettere ed Arti on 26 May 2016.

== Selected publications ==
- with J. Noguchi: A new unicity theorem and Erdős' problem for polarized semi-abelian varieties, Math. Ann., vol. 353, no. 2 (2012), pp. 439–464.
- with U. Zannier: A subspace theorem approach to integral points on curves, Compte Rendu Acad. Sci., vol. 334, 2002, pp. 267–271 doi:10.1016/S1631-073X(02)02240-9
- with U. Zannier: Finiteness of Integral Values for the Ratio of Two Linear Recurrences, Inventiones Mathematicae, vol. 149, 2002, pp. 431–451. doi:10.1007/s002220200221
- with U. Zannier: On Integral Points on Surfaces, Annals of Mathematics, Vol. 160, 2004, pp. 705–726. arXiv preprint
- with U. Zannier: On the rational approximations to the powers of an algebraic number: solution of two problems of Mahler and Mendès France, Acta Mathematica, vol. 193, no. 2, 2004, pp. 175–191. doi:10.1007/BF02392563
- with U. Zannier: Some cases of Vojta's conjecture on integral points over function fields, Journal of Algebraic Geometry, vol. 17, 2008, pp. 295–333. arXiv preprint
