= Suren Arakelov =

Soviet mathematician

Suren Yurievich Arakelov (Russian: Суре́н Ю́рьевич Араке́лов, Armenian: Սուրեն Յուրիի Առաքելով) (born October 16, 1947 in Kharkiv) is a Soviet mathematician of Armenian descent known for developing Arakelov theory.

== Biography ==
From 1965 onwards Arakelov attended the Mathematics department of Moscow State University, where he graduated in 1971.

In 1974, Arakelov received his candidate of sciences degree from the Steklov Institute in Moscow, under the supervision of Igor Shafarevich. He then worked as a junior researcher at the Gubkin Russian State University of Oil and Gas in Moscow until 1979. He did protest against arrest of Alexander Solzhenitsyn, and was arrested and committed to a mental hospital. Then he stopped his research activity to pursue other life goals. As of 2014 he lives in Moscow with his wife and children.

== Arakelov theory ==
Arakelov theory was exploited by Paul Vojta to give a new proof of the Mordell conjecture and by Gerd Faltings in his proof of Lang's generalization of the Mordell conjecture.

== Publications ==
- S. J. Arakelov (1971). "Families of algebraic curves with fixed degeneracies". Mathematics of the USSR-Izvestiya. 5 (6): 1277–1302. doi:10.1070/IM1971v005n06ABEH001235.
- S. J. Arakelov (1974). "Intersection theory of divisors on an arithmetic surface". Mathematics of the USSR-Izvestiya. 8 (6): 1167–1180. doi:10.1070/IM1974v008n06ABEH002141.
- Arakelov, S. J. (1975). "Theory of intersections on an arithmetic surface". Proc. Internat. Congr. Mathematicians. 1. Vancouver: Amer. Math. Soc.: 405–408.
