= Faltings =

Faltings is a surname. Notable people with the surname include:

- Boi Faltings (born 1960), Swiss professor of artificial intelligence
- Gerd Faltings (born 1954), German mathematician, winner of the 2026 Abel Prize

== See also ==
- Faltings' theorem
- Faltings' product theorem
