= Arithmetic surface =

In mathematics, an arithmetic surface over a Dedekind domain $R$ with fraction field $K$ is a geometric object having one conventional dimension, and one other dimension provided by the infinitude of the primes. When $R$ is the ring of integers $\Z$, this intuition depends on the prime ideal spectrum $\operatorname{Spec}(\Z)$ being seen as analogous to a line. Arithmetic surfaces arise naturally in Diophantine geometry, when an algebraic curve defined over $K$ is thought of as having reductions over the residue fields $R/P$ (where $P$ is a prime ideal of $R$) for almost all $P$; and are helpful in specifying what should happen about the process of reducing to $R/P$ when the most naive way fails to make sense.

Such an object can be defined more formally as an $R$-scheme with a non-singular, connected projective curve $C/K$ for a generic fiber and unions of curves (possibly reducible, singular, non-reduced) over the appropriate residue field for special fibers.

== Formal definition ==
An arithmetic surface $S$ over a Dedekind domain $R$ is a scheme with a morphism $p:S\rightarrow \mathrm{Spec}(R)$ such that $S$ is integral, normal, excellent, flat and of finite type over $R$, and the generic fiber is a non-singular, connected projective curve over $\mathrm{Frac}(R)$; and for other $t$ in $\mathrm{Spec}(R)$,

$$S\underset{\mathrm{Spec}(R)}{\times}\mathrm{Spec}(k_t)$$

is a union of curves over $R/t$.

== Over a Dedekind scheme ==
In even more generality, arithmetic surfaces can be defined over Dedekind schemes, a typical example of which is the spectrum of the ring of integers of a number field (which is the case above). An arithmetic surface is then a regular fibered surface over a Dedekind scheme of dimension one. This generalisation is useful, for example, it allows for base curves which are smooth and projective over finite fields, which is important in positive characteristic.

=== Over Dedekind rings ===
Arithmetic surfaces over Dedekind domains are the arithmetic analogue of fibered surfaces over algebraic curves. Arithmetic surfaces arise primarily in the context of number theory. In fact, given a curve $X$ over a number field $K$, there exists an arithmetic surface over the ring of integers $\mathcal{O}_K$ whose generic fiber is isomorphic to $X$. In higher dimensions, one may also consider arithmetic schemes.

== Properties ==
=== Dimension ===
Arithmetic surfaces have dimension 2 and relative dimension 1 over their base.

=== Divisors ===
We can develop a theory of Weil divisors on arithmetic surfaces since every local ring of dimension one is regular. This is briefly stated as "arithmetic surfaces are regular in codimension one." The theory is developed in Hartshorne's Algebraic Geometry, for example.

== Examples ==
=== Projective line ===
The projective line over Dedekind domain $R$ is a smooth, proper arithmetic surface over $R$. The fiber over any maximal ideal $\mathfrak{m}$ is the projective line over the field $R/\mathfrak{m}.$

=== Regular minimal models ===
Néron models for elliptic curves, initially defined over a global field, are examples of this construction, and are much studied examples of arithmetic surfaces. There are strong analogies with elliptic fibrations.

== Intersection theory ==
Given two distinct irreducible divisors and a closed point on the special fiber of an arithmetic surface, we can define the local intersection index of the divisors at the point as you would for any algebraic surface, namely as the dimension of a certain quotient of the local ring at a point. The idea is then to add these local indices up to get a global intersection index. The theory starts to diverge from that of algebraic surfaces when we try to ensure linear equivalent divisors give the same intersection index, this would be used, for example in computing a divisors intersection index with itself. This fails when the base scheme of an arithmetic surface is not "compact". In fact, in this case, linear equivalence may move an intersection point out to infinity. A partial resolution to this is to restrict the set of divisors we want to intersect, in particular forcing at least one divisor to be "fibral" (every component is a component of a special fiber) allows us to define a unique intersection pairing having this property, amongst other desirable ones. A full resolution is given by Arakelov theory.

=== Arakelov theory ===
Arakelov theory offers a solution to the problem presented above. Intuitively, fibers are added at infinity by adding a fiber for each archimedean absolute value of $K$. A local intersection pairing that extends to the full divisor group can then be defined, with the desired invariance under linear equivalence.

== See also ==
- Glossary of arithmetic and Diophantine geometry
