= Igusa variety =

Mathematical structure

In mathematics, an Igusa curve is (roughly) a coarse moduli space of elliptic curves in characteristic p with a level p Igusa structure, where an Igusa structure on an elliptic curve E is roughly a point of order p of E^{(p)} generating the kernel of V : E^{(p)} → E. An Igusa variety is a higher-dimensional analogue of an Igusa curve. Igusa curves were studied by Igusa and Igusa varieties were introduced by Harris and Taylor for studying the bad reduction of some Shimura varieties: the ℓ-adic cohomology of Igusa varieties sheds some light on that of Shimura varieties.
