= Isogeny theorem =

In mathematics, isogeny theorem may refer to:

- Raynaud's isogeny theorem
- Tate's isogeny theorem
