= Arakelov theory =

Mathematical theory

In mathematics, Arakelov theory (or Arakelov geometry) is an approach to Diophantine geometry, named for Suren Arakelov. It is used to study Diophantine equations in higher dimensions.

== Background ==
The main motivation behind Arakelov geometry is that there is a correspondence between prime ideals $\mathfrak{p} \in \text{Spec}(\mathbb{Z})$ and finite places $v_p : \mathbb{Q}^* \to \mathbb{R}$, but there also exists a place at infinity $v_\infty$, given by the Archimedean valuation, which doesn't have a corresponding prime ideal. Arakelov geometry gives a technique for compactifying $\text{Spec}(\mathbb{Z})$ into a complete space
$$\overline{\text{Spec}(\mathbb{Z})}$$
which has a prime lying at infinity. Arakelov's original construction studies one such theory, where a definition of divisors is constructed for a scheme $\mathfrak{X}$ of relative dimension 1 over $\text{Spec}(\mathcal{O}_K)$ such that it extends to a Riemann surface $X_\infty = \mathfrak{X}(\mathbb{C})$ for every valuation at infinity. In addition, he equips these Riemann surfaces with Hermitian metrics on holomorphic vector bundles over X(C), the complex points of $X$. This extra Hermitian structure is applied as a substitute for the failure of the scheme Spec(Z) to be a complete variety.

Note that other techniques exist for constructing a complete space extending $\text{Spec}(\mathbb{Z})$, which is the basis of F_{1} geometry.

=== Original definition of divisors ===
Let $K$ be a field, $\mathcal{O}_K$ its ring of integers, and $X$ a genus $g$ curve over $K$ with a non-singular model $\mathfrak{X} \to \text{Spec}(\mathcal{O}_K)$, called an arithmetic surface. Also, let
$$\infty: K \to \mathbb{C}$$
be an inclusion of fields (which is supposed to represent a place at infinity). Also, let $X_\infty$ be the associated Riemann surface from the base change to $\mathbb{C}$. Using this data, one can define a c-divisor as a formal linear combination
$$D = \sum_i k_i C_i + \sum_\infty \lambda_\infty X_\infty$$
where $C_i$ is an irreducible closed subset of $\mathfrak{X}$ of codimension 1, $k_i \in \mathbb{Z}$, and $\lambda_\infty \in \mathbb{R}$, and the sum
$$\sum_{\infty}\lambda_\infty X_\infty$$
represents the sum over every real embedding of $K \to \mathbb{R}$ and over one embedding for each pair of complex embeddings $K \to \mathbb{C}$. The set of c-divisors forms a group $\text{Div}_c(\mathfrak{X})$.

== Results ==
Arakelov (1974, 1975) defined an intersection theory on the arithmetic surfaces attached to smooth projective curves over number fields, with the aim of proving certain results, known in the case of function fields, in the case of number fields. Gerd Faltings (1984) extended Arakelov's work by establishing results such as a Riemann-Roch theorem, a Noether formula, a Hodge index theorem and the nonnegativity of the self-intersection of the dualizing sheaf in this context.

Arakelov theory was used by Paul Vojta (1991) to give a new proof of the Mordell conjecture, and by Gerd Faltings (1991) in his proof of Serge Lang's generalization of the Mordell conjecture.

Pierre Deligne (1987) developed a more general framework to define the intersection pairing defined on an arithmetic surface over the spectrum of a ring of integers by Arakelov. Shou-Wu Zhang (1992) developed a theory of positive line bundles and proved a Nakai–Moishezon type theorem for arithmetic surfaces. Further developments in the theory of positive line bundles by Zhang (1993, 1995a, 1995b) and Lucien Szpiro, Emmanuel Ullmo, and Zhang (1997) culminated in a proof of the Bogomolov conjecture by Ullmo (1998) and Zhang (1998).

Arakelov's theory was generalized by Henri Gillet and Christophe Soulé to higher dimensions. That is, Gillet and Soulé defined an intersection pairing on an arithmetic variety. One of the main results of Gillet and Soulé is the arithmetic Riemann–Roch theorem of Gillet & Soulé (1992), an extension of the Grothendieck–Riemann–Roch theorem to arithmetic varieties. For this one defines arithmetic Chow groups CH^{p}(X) of an arithmetic variety X, and defines Chern classes for Hermitian vector bundles over X taking values in the arithmetic Chow groups. The arithmetic Riemann–Roch theorem then describes how the Chern class behaves under pushforward of vector bundles under a proper map of arithmetic varieties. A complete proof of this theorem was only published recently by Gillet, Rössler and Soulé.

Arakelov's intersection theory for arithmetic surfaces was developed further by Jean-Benoît Bost (1999). The theory of Bost is based on the use of Green functions which, up to logarithmic singularities, belong to the Sobolev space $L^2_1$ (of L^{2} functions whose derivative is L^{2}). In this context, Bost obtains an arithmetic Hodge index theorem and uses this to obtain Lefschetz theorems for arithmetic surfaces.

== Arithmetic Chow groups ==
An arithmetic cycle of codimension p is a pair (Z, g) where Z ∈ Z^{p}(X) is a p-cycle on X and g is a Green current for Z, a higher-dimensional generalization of a Green function. The arithmetic Chow group $\widehat{\mathrm{CH}}_p(X)$ of codimension p is the quotient of this group by the subgroup generated by certain "trivial" cycles.

== The arithmetic Riemann–Roch theorem ==
The usual Grothendieck–Riemann–Roch theorem describes how the Chern character ch behaves under pushforward of sheaves, and states that ch(f_{∗}(E))= f_{∗}(ch(E)Td_{X/Y}), where f is a proper morphism from X to Y and E is a vector bundle over f. The arithmetic Riemann–Roch theorem is similar, except that the Todd class gets multiplied by a certain power series. The arithmetic Riemann–Roch theorem states
$$\hat{\mathrm{ch}}(f_*([E]))=f_*(\hat{\mathrm{ch}}(E)\widehat{\mathrm{Td}}^R(T_{X/Y}))$$
where

- X and Y are regular projective arithmetic schemes,
- f is a smooth proper map from X to Y,
- E is an arithmetic vector bundle over X,
- $\hat{\mathrm{ch}}$ is the arithmetic Chern character,
- T_{X/Y} is the relative tangent bundle,
- $\hat{\mathrm{Td}}$ is the arithmetic Todd class,
- $\hat{\mathrm{Td}}^R(E)$ is $\hat{\mathrm{Td}}(E)(1-\epsilon(R(E))),$
- R(X) is the additive characteristic class associated to the formal power series
  $$\sum_{{m>0 \atop m\text{ odd}}} \frac{X^m}{m!}\left[2\zeta'(-m) + \zeta(-m) \left({1\over 1} + {1\over 2} + \cdots + {1\over m}\right)\right].$$

== See also ==
- Hodge–Arakelov theory
- Hodge theory
- P-adic Hodge theory
- Adelic group
