= Uniform boundedness conjecture =

Uniform boundedness conjecture may refer to:

- Uniform boundedness conjecture for torsion points
- Uniform boundedness conjecture for rational points
- Uniform boundedness conjecture for preperiodic points

== See also ==
- Uniform boundedness
- Uniform boundedness principle
