= Glossary of number theory =

This is a glossary of concepts and results in number theory, a field of mathematics. Concepts and results in arithmetic geometry and diophantine geometry can be found in Glossary of arithmetic and diophantine geometry.

See also List of number theory topics.

== A ==
abc conjecture
The abc conjecture says that for all ε > 0, there are only finitely many coprime positive integers a, b, and c satisfying a+b=c such that the product of the distinct prime factors of abc raised to the power of 1+ε is less than c.
adele
Adele ring
algebraic number
An algebraic number is a number that is the root of some non-zero polynomial in one variable with integer (or, equivalently, rational) coefficients.
algebraic number field
See number field.
algebraic number theory
Algebraic number theory
analytic number theory
Analytic number theory
Artin
The Artin conjecture says Artin's L function is entire (holomorphic on the entire complex plane).
automorphic form
An automorphic form is a certain holomorphic function.

== B ==
Bézout's identity
Bézout's identity, also called Bézout's lemma, states that if d is the greatest common divisor of two integers a and b, then there exists integers x and y such that ax + by = d, and in fact the integers of the form as + bt are exactly the multiples of d.
Brocard
Brocard's problem

== C ==
Chinese remainder theorem
Chinese remainder theorem
class field
The class field theory concerns abelian extensions of number fields.
class number
1. The class number of a number field is the cardinality of the ideal class group of the field.
2. In group theory, the class number is the number of conjugacy classes of a group.
3. Class number is the number of equivalence classes of binary quadratic forms of a given discriminant.
4. The class number problem.
conductor
Conductor (class field theory)
coprime
Two integers are coprime (also called relatively prime) if the only positive integer that divides them both is 1.

== D ==
Dedekind
Dedekind zeta function.
Diophantine equation
Diophantine equation
Dirichlet
1. Dirichlet's theorem on arithmetic progressions
2. Dirichlet character
3. Dirichlet's unit theorem.
distribution
A distribution in number theory is a generalization/variant of a distribution in analysis.
divisor
A divisor or factor of an integer n is an integer m such that there exists an integer k satisfying n = mk. Divisors can be defined in exactly the same way for polynomials or for elements of a commutative ring.

== E ==
Eisenstein
Eisenstein series
elliptic curve
Elliptic curve
Erdős
Erdős–Kac theorem
Euclid's lemma
Euclid's lemma states that if a prime p divides the product of two integers ab, then p must divide at least one of a or b.
Euler's criterion
Let p is an odd prime and a is an integer not divisible by p. Euler's criterion provides a slick way to determine whether a is a quadratic residue mod p. It says that $a^{\tfrac{p-1}{2}}$ is congruent to 1 mod p if a is a quadratic residue mod p and is congruent to -1 mod p if not. This can be written using Legendre symbols as

$$\left(\frac{a}{p}\right) \equiv a^{\tfrac{p-1}{2}} \pmod p.$$

Euler's theorem
Euler's theorem states that if n and a are coprime positive integers, then a^{φ(n)} is congruent to 1 mod n. Euler's theorem generalizes Fermat's little theorem.
Euler's totient function
For a positive integer n, Euler's totient function of n, denoted φ(n), is the number of integers coprime to n between 1 and n inclusive. For example, φ(4) = 2 and φ(p) = p - 1 for any prime p.

== F ==
factor
See the entry for divisor.
factorization
Factorization is the process of splitting a mathematical object, often integers or polynomials, into a product of factors.
Fermat's Last Theorem
Fermat's Last Theorem, one of the most famous and difficult to prove theorems in number theory, states that for any integer n > 2, the equation a^{n} + b^{n} = c^{n} has no positive integer solutions.
Fermat's little theorem
Fermat's little theorem
field extension
A field extension L/K is a pair of fields K and L such that K is a subfield of L. Given a field extension L/K, the field L is a K-vector space.
fundamental theorem of arithmetic
The fundamental theorem of arithmetic states that every integer greater than 1 can be written uniquely (up to reordering) as a product of primes.

== G ==
Galois
A Galois extension is a finite field extension L/K such that one of the following equivalent conditions are satisfied:
- L/K is a normal extension and a separable extension,
- L is a splitting field of a separable polynomial with coefficients in K,
- |Aut(L/K)| = [L:K], that is, the number of automorphisms of the extension equals its degree.
The automorphism group Aut(L/K) of a Galois extension is called its Galois group and it is denoted Gal(L/K).
global field
Global field
Goldbach's conjecture
Goldbach's conjecture is a conjecture that states that every even natural number greater than 2 is the sum of two primes.
greatest common divisor
The greatest common divisor of a finite list of integers is the largest positive number that is a divisor of every integer in the list.

== H ==
Hasse
Hasse's theorem on elliptic curves.
Hecke
Hecke ring

== I ==
ideal
The ideal class group of a number field is the group of fractional ideals in the ring of integers in the field modulo principal ideals. The cardinality of the group is called the class number of the number field. It measures the extent of the failure of unique factorization.
integer
1. The integers are the numbers …, -3, -2, -1, 0, 1, 2, 3, ….
2. In algebraic number theory, an integer sometimes means an element of a ring of integers; e.g., a Gaussian integer. To avoid ambiguity, an integer contained in $\mathbb{Q}$ is sometimes called a rational integer.
Iwasawa
Iwasawa theory

== L ==
Langlands
Langlands program
least common multiple
The least common multiple of a finite list of integers is the smallest positive number that is a multiple of every integer in the list.
Legendre symbol
Let p be an odd prime and let a be an integer. The Legendre symbol of a and p is

$$\left(\frac{a}{p}\right) =
\begin{cases}
1 & \text{if } a \text{ is a quadratic residue mod } p \text{ and } a \not\equiv 0\pmod p, \\
-1 & \text{if } a \text{ is not a quadratic residue mod } p \text{ and } a \not\equiv 0\pmod p, \\
0 & \text{if } a \equiv 0 \pmod p.
\end{cases}$$

The Legendre symbol provides a convenient notational package for several results, including the law of quadratic reciprocity and Euler's criterion.
local
1. A local field in number theory is the completion of a number field at a finite place.
2. The local–global principle.

== M ==
Mersenne prime
A Mersenne prime is a prime number one less than a power of 2.
modular form
Modular form
modularity theorem
The modularity theorem (which used to be called the Taniyama–Shimura conjecture)

== N ==
number field
A number field, also called an algebraic number field, is a finite-degree field extension of the field of rational numbers.
non-abelian
The non-abelian class field theory is an extension of the class field theory (which is about abelian extensions of number fields) to non-abelian extensions; or at least the idea of such a theory. The non-abelian theory does not exist in a definitive form today.

== P ==
Pell's equation
Pell's equation
period
period conjecture
place
A place is an equivalence class of non-Archimedean valuations (finite place) or absolute values (infinite place).
prime number
1. A prime number is a positive integer with no divisors other than itself and 1.
2. The prime number theorem describes the asymptotic distribution of prime numbers.
profinite
A profinite integer is an element in the profinite completion $\widehat{\mathbb Z}$ of $\mathbb{Z}$ along all integers.
Pythagorean triple
A Pythagorean triple is three positive integers a, b, c such that a^{2} + b^{2} = c^{2}.

== R ==
ramification
The ramification theory.
relatively prime
See coprime.
ring of integers
The ring of integers in a number field is the ring consisting of all algebraic numbers contained in the field.

== Q ==
quadratic reciprocity
Let p and q be distinct odd prime numbers, and define the Legendre symbol as

$$\left(\frac{q}{p}\right)
=\begin{cases}
1 & \text{if } n^2 \equiv q \bmod p \text{ for some integer } n\\
-1 & \text{otherwise}.
\end{cases}$$

The law of quadratic reciprocity states that

$$\left(\frac{p}{q}\right) \left(\frac{q}{p}\right) = (-1)^{\frac{p-1}{2}\frac{q-1}{2}}.$$

This result aids in the computation of Legendre symbols and thus helps determine whether an integer is a quadratic residue.

quadratic residue
An integer q is called a quadratic residue mod n if it is congruent to a perfect square mod n, i.e., if there exists an integer x such that $x^2\equiv q \pmod{n}.$

== S ==
sieve of Eratosthenes
Sieve of Eratosthenes
square-free integer
A square-free integer is an integer that is not divisible by any square other than 1.
square number
A square number is an integer that is the square of an integer. For example, 4 and 9 are squares, but 10 is not a square.
Szpiro
Szpiro's conjecture is, in a modified form, equivalent to the abc conjecture.

== T ==
Takagi
Takagi existence theorem is a theorem in class field theory.
totient function
See Euler's totient function.
twin prime
A twin prime is a prime number that is 2 less or 2 more than another prime number. For example, 7 is a twin prime, since it is prime and 5 is also prime.

== V ==
valuation
valuation (algebra)
valued field
A valued field is a field with a valuation on it.
Vojta
Vojta's conjecture

== W ==
Wilson's theorem
Wilson's theorem states that n > 1 is prime if and only if (n-1)! is congruent to -1 mod n.
