= Umberto Zannier =

Italian mathematician (born 1957)

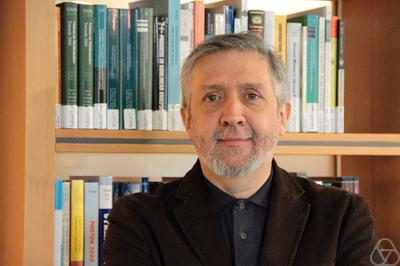
- Umberto Zannier
- Born: 25 May 1957 (age 69); Spilimbergo, Italy
- Education: Scuola Normale Superiore di Pisa
- Known for: Manin–Mumford conjecture Siegel's theorem on integral points
- Awards: Mathematics Prize of the Accademia dei XL (2005)
- Scientific career
- Fields: Mathematics
- Workplaces: Scuola Normale Superiore di Pisa; Università IUAV di Venezia; University of Salerno; University of Padua
- Doctoral advisor: Enrico Bombieri

Umberto Zannier (born 25 May 1957, in Spilimbergo, Italy) is an Italian mathematician, specializing in number theory and Diophantine geometry.

== Education ==
Zannier earned a Laurea degree from University of Pisa and studied at the Scuola Normale Superiore di Pisa with Ph.D. supervised by Enrico Bombieri.

== Career ==
Zannier was from 1983 to 1987 a researcher at the University of Padua, from 1987 to 1991 an associate professor at the University of Salerno, and from 1991 to 2003 a full professor at the Università IUAV di Venezia. From 2003 to the present he has been a Professor in Geometry at the Scuola Normale Superiore di Pisa.

In 2010 he gave the Hermann Weyl Lectures at the Institute for Advanced Study. He was a visiting professor at several institutions, including the Institut Henri Poincaré in Paris, the ETH Zurich, and the Erwin Schrödinger Institute in Vienna.

With Jonathan Pila he developed a method (now known as the Pila-Zannier method) of applying O-minimality to number-theoretical and algebro-geometric problems. Thus they gave a new proof of the Manin–Mumford conjecture (which was first proved by Michel Raynaud and Ehud Hrushovski). Zannier and Pietro Corvaja in 2002 gave a new proof of Siegel's theorem on integral points by using a new method based upon the subspace theorem.

== Awards & Service ==
Zannier was an Invited Speaker at the 4th European Mathematical Congress in Stockholm in 2004. Zannier was elected a corresponding member of the Istituto Veneto in 2004, a member of the Accademia dei Lincei in 2006, and a member of Academia Europaea in 2012. In 2014 he was an Invited Speaker of the International Congress of Mathematicians in Seoul.

In 2005 Zannier received the Mathematics Prize of the Accademia dei XL and in 2011 an Advanced Grant from the European Research Council (ERC). He is chief editor of the Annali di Scuola Normale Superiore and a co-editor of Acta Arithmetica.

== Selected publications ==
- Zannier, U. (1982). "On the distribution of self-numbers". Proceedings of the American Mathematical Society. 85: 10–14. doi:10.1090/S0002-9939-1982-0647887-4. (See self number.)
- Zannier, U. (2003). Some Applications of Diophantine Approximation to Diophantine Equations (with Special Emphasis on the Schmidt Subspace Theorem). Forum Editrice.
- Zannier, U. (2015) [2009]. Lecture Notes on Diophantine Analysis (Reprint ed.). Springer. ISBN 978-88-7642-517-2.
- Zannier, U.; Masser, D. W. (2012). Some Problems of Unlikely Intersections in Arithmetic and Geometry. Annals of Mathematics Studies. Vol. 181. Princeton University Press. ISBN 978-0-691-15371-1.
- Bombieri, E.; Masser, D.; Zannier, U. (1999). "Intersecting a curve with algebraic subgroups of multiplicative groups". International Mathematics Research Notices (20): 1119. doi:10.1155/S1073792899000628.
- Zannier, U. (2000). "A Proof of Pisot's d^{th} Root Conjecture" (PDF). Annals of Mathematics. 151 (1): 375–383. arXiv:math/0010024. doi:10.2307/121122. JSTOR 121122.
- Corvaja, P.; Zannier, U. (2002). "A subspace theorem approach to integral points on curves". Comptes Rendus. Mathématique. 334 (4): 267–271. doi:10.1016/S1631-073X(02)02240-9.
- Corvaja, P.; Zannier, U. (2002). "Finiteness of integral values for the ratio of two linear recurrences". Inventiones Mathematicae. 149 (2): 431–451. Bibcode:2002InMat.149..431C. doi:10.1007/s002220200221.
- Corvaja, P.; Zannier, U. (2004). "On integral points on surfaces". Annals of Mathematics. 160 (2): 705–726. arXiv:math/0206100. doi:10.4007/annals.2004.160.705.
- Corvaja, P.; Zannier, U. (2004). "On the rational approximations to the powers of an algebraic number: Solution of two problems of Mahler and Mendès France". Acta Mathematica. 193 (2): 175–191. doi:10.1007/BF02392563.
- Corvaja, P.; Zannier, U. (2007). "Some cases of Vojta's conjecture on integral points over function fields". Journal of Algebraic Geometry. 17 (2): 295–333. arXiv:math/0512074. doi:10.1090/S1056-3911-07-00489-4.
- Amoroso, F.; Zannier, U., eds. (2003). Diophantine Approximation: Lectures Given at the C.I.M.E. Summer School Held in Cetraro, Italy, June 28 – July 6, 2000. Lecture Notes in Mathematics. Vol. 1819. Springer. doi:10.1007/3-540-44979-5. ISBN 978-3-540-40392-0.
- Zannier, U.; Pila, J. (2008). "Rational points in periodic analytic sets and the Manin-Mumford conjecture". Rendiconti Lincei. Scienze Fisiche e Naturali. 19 (2): 149. arXiv:0802.4016. Bibcode:2008RLSFN..19..149Z. doi:10.4171/rlm/514.
