= Heath-Brown–Moroz constant =

Mathematical constant

The Heath-Brown–Moroz constant C, named for Roger Heath-Brown and Boris Moroz, is defined as

$$C=\prod_p\left(1-\frac{1}{p}\right)^7\left(1+\frac{7p+1}{p^2}\right) = 0.001317641...$$

where p runs over the primes.

== Application ==
This constant is part of an asymptotic estimate for the distribution of rational points of bounded height on the cubic surface X_{0}^{3}=X_{1}X_{2}X_{3}. Let H be a positive real number and N(H) the number of solutions to the equation X_{0}^{3}=X_{1}X_{2}X_{3} with all the X_{i} non-negative integers less than or equal to H and their greatest common divisor equal to 1. Then

$$N(H)= C \cdot \frac{H(\log H)^6} {4\times 6!} + O(H(\log H)^5)$$.

== See also ==
- Euler product § Notable constants
