= Karl Georg Christian von Staudt Prize =

German mathematics prize

The Karl Georg Christian von Staudt Prize, or von Staudt Prize for short, is a German math prize that is awarded every three to six years. The prize can be awarded to one or more mathematicians who work at a German university or research institution, provided that the stay is not temporary. It recognizes "outstanding, pioneering and published research results in the field of pure mathematics".

The award is named after Karl Georg Christian von Staudt, who held the chair of mathematics at the University of Erlangen from 1835 to 1867. The Otto and Edith Haupt Foundation donated the capital for the prize money. Otto Haupt was one of Staudt's successors to the chair in Erlangen. According to the original statutes, the prize was endowed with at least 50,000 DM; in 2004, the two prize winners received a total of 30,000 euros. The current statutes (as of 2014) provide for prize money of 25,000 euros.

== Award winners ==
- 1991 Hans Grauert for his work in the field of function theory
- 1994 Stefan Hildebrandt for his work on the calculus of variations
- 1997 Martin Kneser for his contributions to the theory of quadratic forms
- 2001 Don Zagier for his work on number theory
- 2004 Günter Harder for his work on the theory of algebraic groups and Friedhelm Waldhausen for his results on three-dimensional manifolds and algebraic K-theory
- 2008 Gerd Faltings for his outstanding achievements in the field of theoretical mathematics, for the proofs of numerous conjectures in arithmetic geometry and for his research on cohomology and the theory of vector bundles on curves
- 2013 Michael Rapoport in recognition of his work on arithmetic geometry and related areas
- 2022 Burkhard Wilking for the construction of metrics with non-negative sectional curvature, the rigidity theorems for manifolds of positive curvature and in particular the creative use of the Ricci flow
- 2025 Wolfgang Lück for his outstanding contributions to topology
