= Meesdorf =

Urban district in Melle, Lower Saxony, Germany

Coordinates: 52.2636°N 8.4104°E

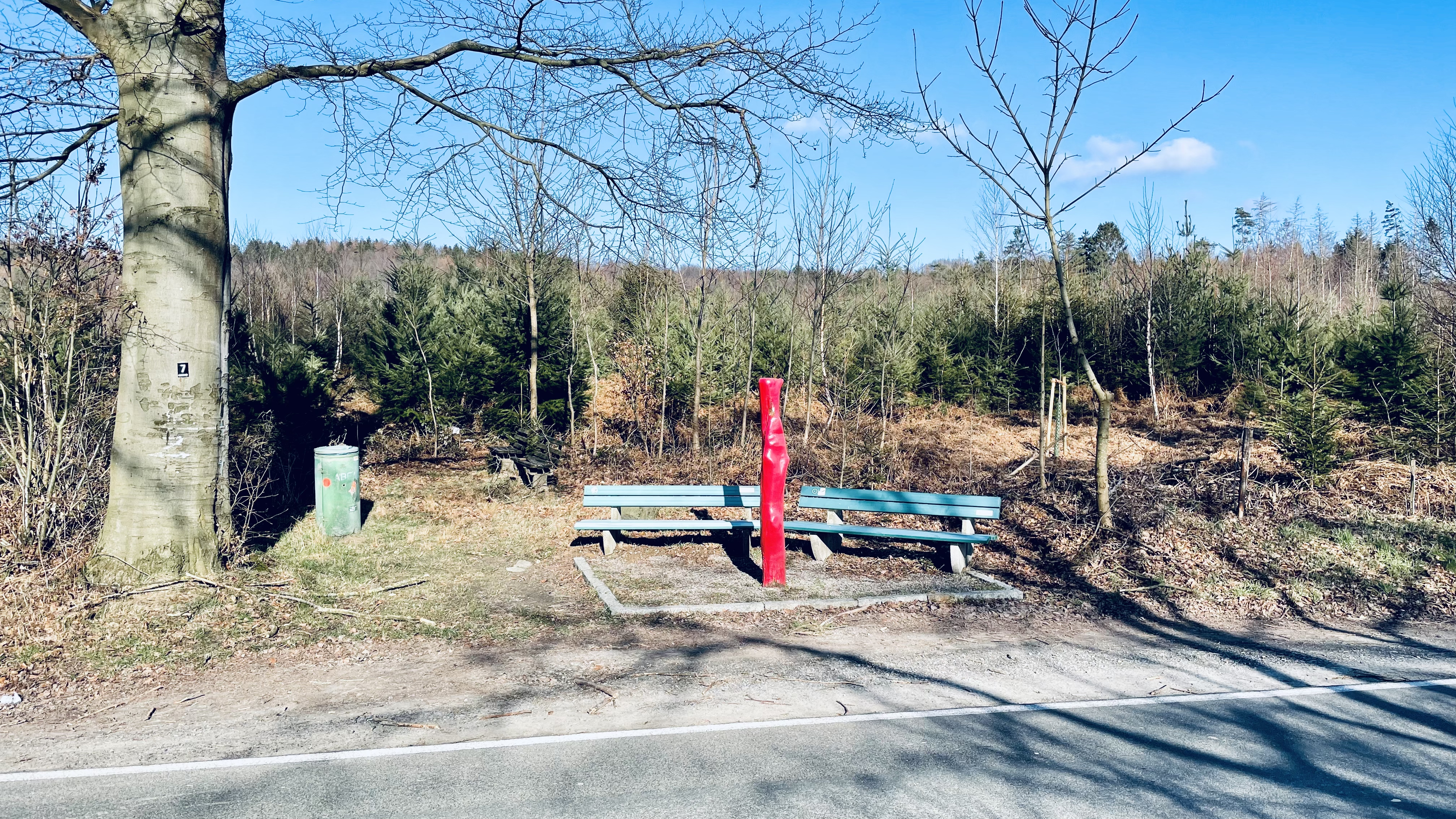
Meesdorf Roter Pfahl

Meesdorf (Germany) is an urban district of Buer at the city of Melle in Osnabrück, Lower Saxony. It is located landwards at the Wiehen hills in Hunte valley and was historically known as "Metdisdorphe".

== Locale ==
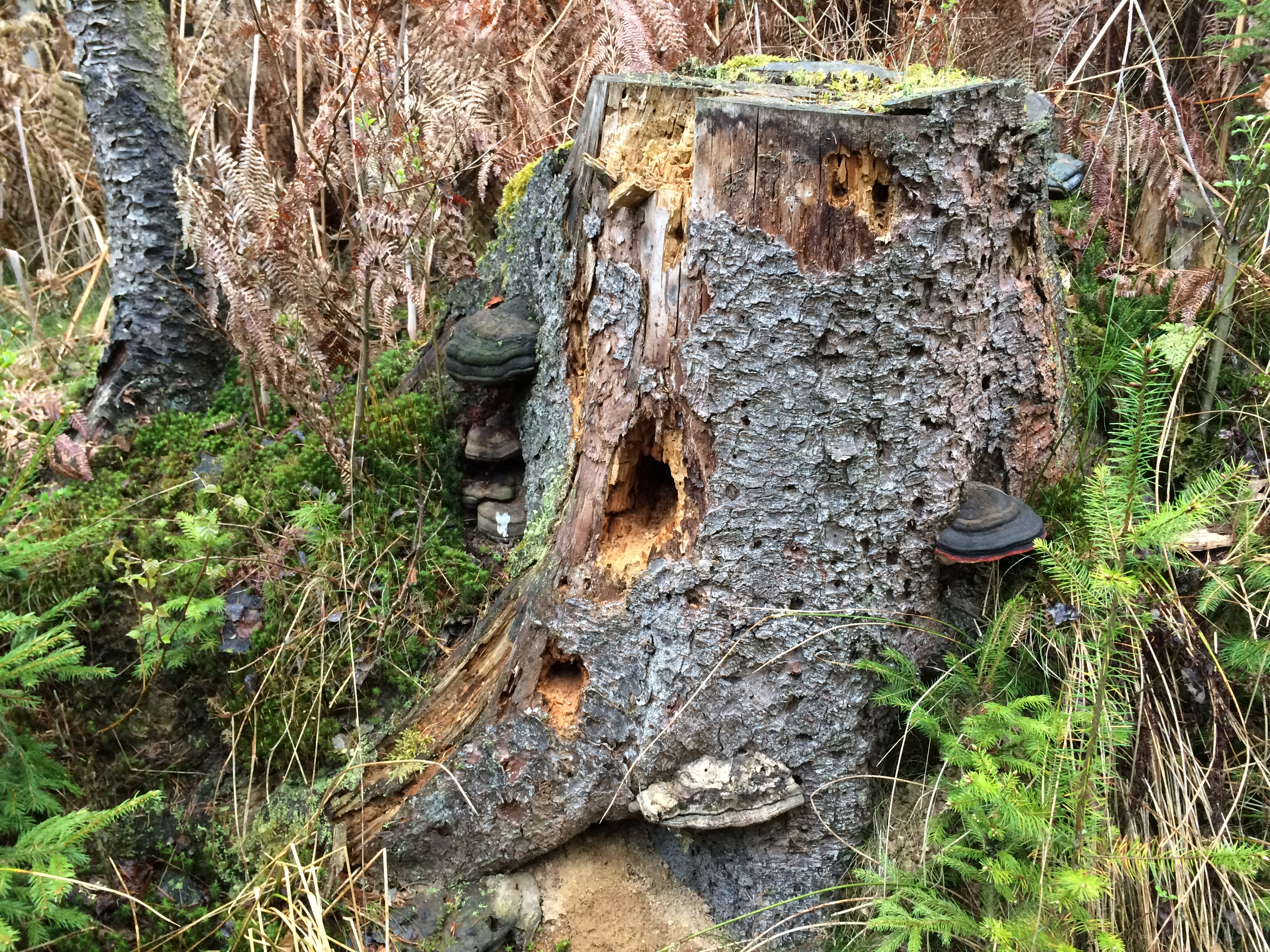
Nature around treestump

In the northern part of Hunte Valley, dinosaur tracks were discovered. The erected building is rainproof. Around Barkhausen are signs to museums/exhibitions. At Hunte Valley, explorers also find many ways that lead into the Wiehenhills.

The "Rote Pfahl" is a marker at the side of the Kalbsiekstrasse-road, where 19th century trader's route through Meesdorf is recorded. To move loaded wagons over the Bad Essen hill, traders had to use additional horses. The marker was used to signal to the traders the availability of a safe parking space. It represented, for other purposes a rallypoint, in case something uncommon ever happened (crimes, accidents, robberies, meetings, etc.).

The 13 ton boulderflint at the Glockenstraße-crossroads shall remind visitors of the long history of Meesdorf.

Etymological the village Meisdorf can be compared and is historically proven to have developed from with "Meyerstorp".

== Associations ==
- Oldtimermachines Melle-Buer
- Soccersports GreenWhite Meesdorf
- Rabbitclub Melle-Buer

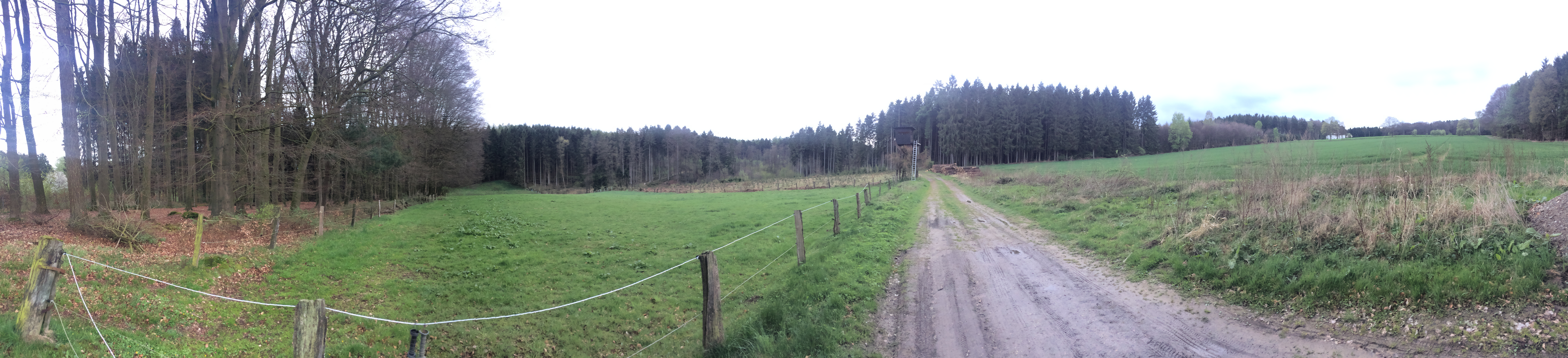
Meesdorf Panorama of a dirtroad

== Festivities ==
- Yearly sportsfestival on soccersplace
- Yearly Easter Fire at tentsplace
- Hunters Meeting with venisonmeal
- Yearly Saint Nicholas meeting

== Economic activity ==
The raw land is mostly used for conventional and in small portions ecological farming. Roads are also often used for sports like Nordic walking in groups. The local camping ground can host about 200 and more people. Other economically uses include:

- timber and woodworking industry
- metal manufacturing
- farm machine dealing and repairing
- cargo company
- junkyarding
- information technologies

== Notables ==
- Ernst Buermeyer (1883–1945) Educator, mayor of Gildehaus (Bad Bentheim), political party member of (DVP) and (NSDAP)
