= Buer, Germany =

Buer
- Stadtteil of Gelsenkirchen
- Coat of arms
- Interactive map of Buer
- Location within Germany Location within North Rhine-Westphalia
- Coordinates: 51°34′40″N 07°03′23″E
- Country: Germany
- State: North Rhine-Westphalia
- Admin. region: Münster
- District: Urban district
- City: Gelsenkirchen

Population (2009-12-31)
  - Total: 34,130
- Time zone: UTC+01:00 (CET)
  - Summer (DST): UTC+02:00 (CEST)
- Dialling codes: 0209
- Vehicle registration: GE

Buer is the largest suburb of Gelsenkirchen in North Rhine-Westphalia. The Hochstrasse in the heart of Buer is the largest shopping street in Gelsenkirchen.

== History ==
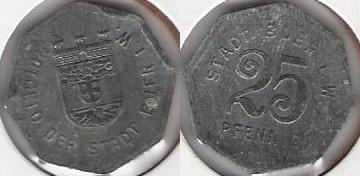
Notgeld coin issued by the city of Buer in 1918.

In 1928, the adjoining cities of Buer, Gelsenkirchen, and Horst merged to form Gelsenkirchen-Buer, which was renamed Gelsenkirchen in 1930.

The Scholven/Buer synthetic oil plant was a bombing target of the Oil Campaign of World War II The Buer town hall however survived in nearly original form.

== Localities ==
- Meesdorf

== Notable people ==
- Gerd Faltings (born 1954), German mathematician
- Oliver Mark (born 1963), German photographer and artist
