= Igusa group =

In mathematics, an Igusa group or Igusa subgroup is a subgroup of the Siegel modular group defined by some congruence conditions. They were introduced by Igusa (1964).

== Definition ==
The symplectic group Sp_{2g}(Z) consists of the matrices

$$\begin{pmatrix}A&B\\ C&D \end{pmatrix}$$

such that AB^{t} and CD^{t} are symmetric, and AD^{t} − CB^{t} = I (the identity matrix).

The Igusa group Γ_{g}(n,2n) = Γ_{n,2n} consists of the matrices

$$\begin{pmatrix}A&B\\ C&D \end{pmatrix}$$

in Sp_{2g}(Z) such that B and C are congruent to 0 mod n, A and D are congruent to the identity matrix I mod n, and the diagonals of AB^{t} and CD^{t} are congruent to 0 mod 2n. We have Γ_{g}(2n) ⊆ Γ_{g}(n,2n) ⊆ Γ_{g}(n) where Γ_{g}(n) is the subgroup of matrices congruent to the identity modulo n.
