= Vojta's conjecture =

On heights of points on algebraic varieties over number fields

In mathematics, Vojta's conjecture is a conjecture introduced by Paul Vojta about heights of points on algebraic varieties over number fields. The conjecture was motivated by an analogy between diophantine approximation and Nevanlinna theory (value distribution theory) in complex analysis. It implies many other conjectures in Diophantine approximation, Diophantine equations, arithmetic geometry, and mathematical logic.

== Statement of the conjecture ==
Let $F$ be a number field, let $X/F$ be a non-singular algebraic variety, let $D$ be an effective divisor on $X$ with at worst normal crossings, let $H$ be an ample divisor on $X$, and let $K_X$ be a canonical divisor on $X$. Choose Weil height functions $h_H$ and $h_{K_X}$ and, for each absolute value $v$ on $F$, a local height function $\lambda_{D,v}$. Fix a finite set of absolute values $S$ of $F$, and let $\varepsilon>0$. Then there is a constant $C$ and a non-empty Zariski open set $U\subseteq X$, depending on all of the above choices, such that

$$\sum_{v\in S} \lambda_{D,v}(P) + h_{K_X}(P) \leq \varepsilon h_H(P) + C$$

for all $P\in U(F)$.

=== Examples ===
- Let $X=\mathbb{P}^N$. Then $K_X\sim -(N+1)H$, so Vojta's conjecture reads

$$\sum_{v\in S} \lambda_{D,v}(P) \le (N+1+\epsilon) h_H(P) + C$$

for all $P\in U(F)$.

- Let $X$ be a variety with trivial canonical bundle, for example, an abelian variety, a K3 surface or a Calabi-Yau variety. Vojta's conjecture predicts that if $D$ is an effective ample normal crossings divisor, then the $S$-integral points on the affine variety $X\setminus D$ are not Zariski dense. For abelian varieties, this was conjectured by Lang and proven by Faltings.
- Let $X$ be a variety of general type, i.e., $K_X$ is ample on some non-empty Zariski open subset of $X$. Then taking $S=\emptyset$, Vojta's conjecture predicts that $X(F)$ is not Zariski dense in $X$. This last statement for varieties of general type is the Bombieri–Lang conjecture.

== Generalizations ==
There are generalizations in which $P$ is allowed to vary over $X(\overline{F})$, and there is an additional term in the upper bound that depends on the discriminant of the field extension $F(P)/F$.

There are generalizations in which the non-archimedean local heights $\lambda_{D,v}$ are replaced by truncated local heights, which are local heights in which multiplicities are ignored. These versions of Vojta's conjecture provide natural higher-dimensional analogues of the ABC conjecture.
