= Mordellic variety =

In mathematics, a Mordellic variety is an algebraic variety which has only finitely many points in any finitely generated field. The terminology was introduced by Serge Lang to enunciate a range of conjectures linking the geometry of varieties to their Diophantine properties.

== Formal definition ==
Formally, let X be a variety defined over an algebraically closed field of characteristic zero: hence X is defined over a finitely generated field E. If the set of points X(F) is finite for any finitely generated field extension F of E, then X is Mordellic.

== Lang's conjectures ==
The special set for a projective variety V is the Zariski closure of the union of the images of all non-trivial maps from algebraic groups into V. Lang conjectured that the complement of the special set is Mordellic.

A variety is algebraically hyperbolic if the special set is empty. Lang conjectured that a variety X is Mordellic if and only if X is algebraically hyperbolic and that this is in turn equivalent to X being pseudo-canonical.

For a complex algebraic variety X we similarly define the analytic special or exceptional set as the Zariski closure of the union of images of non-trivial holomorphic maps from C to X. Brody's definition of a hyperbolic variety is that there are no such maps. Again, Lang conjectured that a hyperbolic variety is Mordellic and more generally that the complement of the analytic special set is Mordellic.
