= Uniform boundedness conjecture for rational points =

Mathematics conjecture about rational points on algebraic curves

In arithmetic geometry, the uniform boundedness conjecture for rational points asserts that for a given number field $K$ and a positive integer $g \geq 2$, there exists a number $N(K,g)$ depending only on $K$ and $g$ such that for any algebraic curve $C$ defined over $K$ having genus equal to $g$ has at most $N(K,g)$ $K$-rational points. This is a refinement of Faltings' theorem, which asserts that the set of $K$-rational points $C(K)$ is necessarily finite.

== Progress ==
The first significant progress towards the conjecture was due to Caporaso, Harris, and Mazur. They proved that the conjecture holds if one assumes the Bombieri–Lang conjecture.

== Mazur's conjecture B ==
Mazur's conjecture B is a weaker variant of the uniform boundedness conjecture that asserts that there should be a number $N(K,g,r)$ such that for any algebraic curve $C$ defined over $K$ having genus $g$ and whose Jacobian variety $J_C$ has Mordell–Weil rank over $K$ equal to $r$, the number of $K$-rational points of $C$ is at most $N(K,g,r)$.

Michael Stoll proved that Mazur's conjecture B holds for hyperelliptic curves with the additional hypothesis that $r \leq g - 3$. Stoll's result was further refined by Katz, Rabinoff, and Zureick-Brown in 2015. Both of these works rely on Chabauty's method.

Mazur's conjecture B was resolved by Dimitrov, Gao, and Habegger in 2021 using the earlier work of Gao and Habegger on the geometric Bogomolov conjecture and Gao's work on Betti maps instead of Chabauty's method.
