= Henri Gillet =

American mathematician

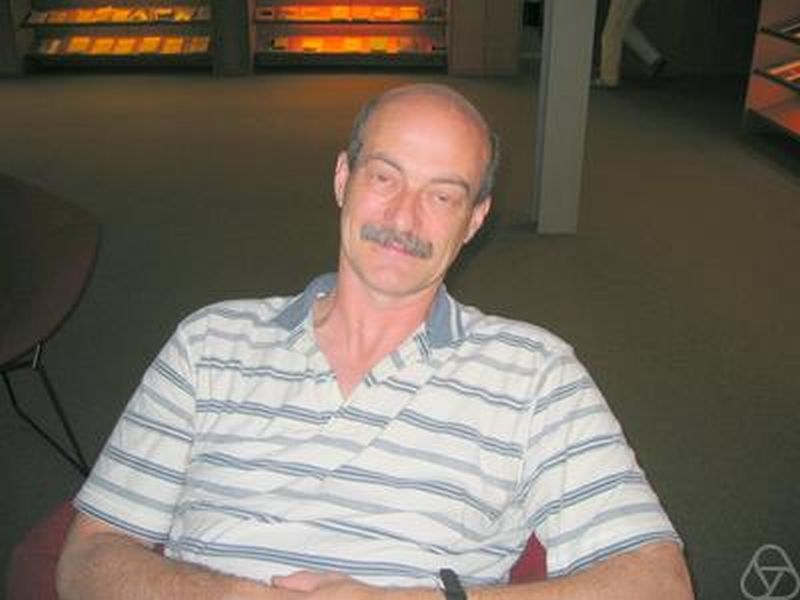
Henri Gillet (2006)

Henri Antoine Gillet (born 8 July 1953, Tangier) is an American mathematician, specializing in arithmetic geometry and algebraic geometry.

== Education and career ==
Gillet received in 1974 his bachelor's degree from King's College London and in 1978 his Ph.D. from Harvard University under David Mumford with thesis Applications of Algebraic K-Theory to Intersection Theory. As a postdoc he was an instructor and from 1981 an assistant professor at Princeton University. He became in 1984 an assistant professor, in 1986 an associate professor, and in 1988 a full professor at the University of Illinois at Chicago, where he was from 1996 to 2001 the head of the department of mathematics, statistics, and computer science. He was a visiting scholar at the Tata Institute of Fundamental Research (2006), the Institute for Advanced Study (1987), the IHES (1985, 1986, 1988), in Barcelona, at the Fields Institute in Toronto and at the Isaac Newton Institute (1998).

Gillet's research deals with differential geometry, algebraic und arithmetic geometry, in particular Arakelov theory and algebraic K-theory. He collaborated with Christophe Soulé and Jean-Michel Bismut. Gillet and Soulé proved in 1992 an arithmetic Riemann–Roch theorem.

Gillet was in 2008 a Senior Fellow at the Clay Mathematics Institute and from 1986 to 1989 a Sloan Fellow. He was an Invited Speaker with talk A Riemann-Roch theorem in arithmetic geometry at the International Congress of Mathematicians in Kyōto in 1990. He was from 1994 to 1999 an editor for the American Journal of Mathematics, from 1995 to 1998 for the International Mathematics Research Notices, and from 2003 to 2007 for the Illinois Journal of Mathematics.

== Selected publications ==
- with Christophe Soulé: Direct images of Hermitian holomorphic bundles Bull. Amer. Math. Soc. vol. 15, 1986, 209–212 doi:10.1090/S0273-0979-1986-15476-5
- with Jean-Michel Bismut and Christophe Soulé: Analytic torsion and holomorphic determinant bundles 1–3, Comm. Math. Phys., vol. 115, 1988, pp. 49–78 doi:10.1007/BF01238853, 79–126 doi:10.1007/BF01238854, 301–351 doi:10.1007/BF01466774
- with Soulé: Arithmetic intersection theory, Pub. Math. IHES, vol. 72, 1990, p. 94–174 doi:10.1007/BF02699132
- with Bismut and Soulé: Complex immersions and Arakelov Geometry, in Pierre Cartier et al. (eds.): Grothendieck Festschrift, vol. 1, 1990, Birkhäuser, pp. 249–331 doi:10.1007/978-0-8176-4574-8_8
- with Soulé: An arithmetic Riemann-Roch Theorem, Inventiones Mathematicae, vol. 110, 1992, pp. 473–543 doi:10.1007/BF01231343
- K-theory and intersection theory in Eric Friedlander, Daniel Grayson (eds.): Handbook of K-theory, Springer 2005, pp. 235–293 doi:10.1007/978-3-540-27855-9_7
