= Raynaud surface =

Type of algebraic surface

In mathematics, a Raynaud surface is a particular kind of algebraic surface that was introduced in William E. Lang (1979) and named for Michel Raynaud (1978). To be precise, a Raynaud surface is a quasi-elliptic surface over an algebraic curve of genus g greater than 1, such that all fibers are irreducible and the fibration has a section. The Kodaira vanishing theorem fails for such surfaces; in other words the Kodaira theorem, valid in algebraic geometry over the complex numbers, has such surfaces as counterexamples, and these can only exist in characteristic p.

Generalized Raynaud surfaces were introduced in (Lang 1983), and give examples of surfaces of general type with global vector fields.
