= Igusa zeta function =

Type of generating function in mathematics

In mathematics, an Igusa zeta function is a type of generating function, counting the number of solutions of an equation, modulo p, p^{2}, p^{3}, and so on.

== Definition ==
For a prime number p let K be a p-adic field, i.e. $[K: \mathbb{Q}_p]<\infty$, R the valuation ring and P the maximal ideal. For $z \in K$ we denote by $\operatorname{ord}(z)$ the valuation of z, $\mid z \mid = q^{-\operatorname{ord}(z)}$, and $ac(z)=z \pi^{-\operatorname{ord}(z)}$ for a uniformizing parameter π of R.

Furthermore let $\phi : K^n \to \mathbb{C}$ be a Schwartz–Bruhat function, i.e. a locally constant function with compact support and let $\chi$ be a character of $R^\times$.

In this situation one associates to a non-constant polynomial $f(x_1, \ldots, x_n) \in K[x_1,\ldots,x_n]$ the Igusa zeta function

$$Z_\phi(s,\chi) = \int_{K^n} \phi(x_1,\ldots,x_n) \chi(ac(f(x_1,\ldots,x_n))) |f(x_1,\ldots,x_n)|^s \, dx$$

where $s \in \mathbb{C}, \operatorname{Re}(s)>0,$ and dx is Haar measure so normalized that $R^n$ has measure 1.

== Igusa's theorem ==
Jun-Ichi Igusa (1974) showed that $Z_\phi (s,\chi)$ is a rational function in $t=q^{-s}$. The proof uses Heisuke Hironaka's theorem about the resolution of singularities. Later, an entirely different proof was given by Jan Denef using p-adic cell decomposition. Little is known, however, about explicit formulas. (There are some results about Igusa zeta functions of Fermat varieties.)

== Congruences modulo powers of P ==
Henceforth we take $\phi$ to be the characteristic function of $R^n$ and $\chi$ to be the trivial character. Let $N_i$ denote the number of solutions of the congruence

$$f(x_1,\ldots,x_n) \equiv 0 \mod P^i$$.

Then the Igusa zeta function

$$Z(t)= \int_{R^n} |f(x_1,\ldots,x_n)|^t \, dx$$

is closely related to the Poincaré series

$$P(t)= \sum_{i=0}^{\infty} q^{-in}N_i t^i$$

by

$$P(t)= \frac{1-t Z(t)}{1-t}.$$
