= Raynaud's isogeny theorem =

Mathematical theorem

In mathematics, Raynaud's isogeny theorem, proved by Raynaud (1985), relates the Faltings heights of two isogeneous elliptic curves.
