= Geometric class field theory =

In mathematics, geometric class field theory is an extension of class field theory to higher-dimensional geometrical objects: much the same way as class field theory describes the abelianization of the Galois group of a local or global field, geometric class field theory describes the abelianized fundamental group of higher dimensional schemes in terms of data related to algebraic cycles.
