= Pseudo-canonical variety =

In mathematics, a pseudo-canonical variety is an algebraic variety of "general type".

== Formal definition ==
Formally, a variety X is pseudo-canonical if the canonical class is pseudo-ample.

== Results ==
For a non-singular projective variety, a result of Kodaira states that this is equivalent to a divisor in the class being the sum of an ample divisor and an effective divisor.

== See also ==
- Bombieri–Lang conjecture
