= Journal of Number Theory =

- Discipline: Mathematics
- Language: English
- Edited by: Dorian Goldfeld

Publication details
- History: 1969-present
- Publisher: Elsevier
- Frequency: Monthly
- Impact factor: 0.7 (2022)

Standard abbreviations
- ISO 4: J. Number Theory

Indexing
- CODEN: JNUTA9
- ISSN: 0022-314X
- LCCN: 78006864
- OCLC no.: 01800049

Links
- Journal homepage; Online archive

The Journal of Number Theory (JNT) is a monthly peer-reviewed scientific journal covering all aspects of number theory. The journal was established in 1969 by R.P. Bambah, P. Roquette, A. Ross, A. Woods, and H. Zassenhaus (Ohio State University). It is currently published monthly by Elsevier and the editor-in-chief is Dorian Goldfeld (Columbia University). According to the Journal Citation Reports, the journal has a 2022 impact factor of 0.7.

== David Goss prize ==
The David Goss Prize in Number theory, founded by the Journal of Number Theory, is awarded every two years, to mathematicians under the age of 35 for outstanding contributions to number theory. The prize is dedicated to the memory of David Goss who was the former editor in chief of the Journal of Number Theory. The current award is US$10,000.

The winners are selected and chosen by the scientific organizing committee of the JNT Biennial Conference and announced during the JNT Biennial Conference.

=== List of winners ===
List of winners
Year	Winners	Institution	References
2019	Alexander Smith	Harvard University	
2022	Vesselin Dimitrov and Ziyang Gao	University of Toronto and Leibniz University Hannover	
2024	Chao Li	Columbia University	
2026	Lue Pan	Columbia University	
