= Faltings' product theorem =

On when a subvariety of a product of projective spaces is a product of varieties

In arithmetic geometry, Faltings' product theorem gives sufficient conditions for a subvariety of a product of projective spaces to be a product of varieties in the projective spaces. It was introduced by Faltings (1991) in his proof of Lang's conjecture that subvarieties of an abelian variety containing no translates of non-trivial abelian subvarieties have only finitely many rational points.

Evertse (1995) and Ferretti (1996) gave explicit versions of Faltings' product theorem.
