= Siegel's theorem on integral points =

Finiteness of integral points on curves of positive genus over number fields

In mathematics, Siegel's theorem on integral points states that a smooth algebraic curve of genus greater than zero, defined over a number field, has only finitely many integral points. More generally, the same conclusion holds for an affine curve of genus zero with at least three points at infinity. The theorem was proved by Carl Ludwig Siegel in 1929 and was the first major result on Diophantine equations that depended only on the genus of the curve and not on any special algebraic form of the equations.

Siegel's proof is ineffective: it shows that the set of integral points is finite, but it gives no method for determining it. For curves of genus at least two, Faltings' theorem (1983) shows that even the set of rational points is finite, but Siegel's theorem remains the fundamental finiteness result for curves of genus one and genus zero.

== Statement ==
Siegel's theorem on integral points
For a smooth algebraic curve C of genus g defined over a number field K, presented in affine space in a given coordinate system, there are only finitely many points on C with coordinates in the ring of integers O of K, provided g > 0.

The theorem is usually stated in a more general form. Let $C$ be an affine curve over a number field $K$, let $S$ be a finite set of places of $K$ containing the archimedean places, and let $\tilde C$ be the smooth projective curve birational to $C$. Let $g$ be the genus of $\tilde C$ and $n$ the number of points at infinity, that is, the points of $\tilde C(\overline K)$ that do not correspond to points of $C$. If $2g - 2 + n > 0$, that is, if $g \ge 1$, or $g = 0$ and $n \ge 3$, then $C$ has only finitely many $S$-integral points.

The condition is sharp. A curve of genus zero with one or two points at infinity can have infinitely many integral points: the affine line has one point at infinity, and the curve defined by the Pell equation $x^2 - dy^2 = 1$, with $d > 0$ not a square, has two points at infinity and infinitely many integral points.

== Examples ==
For every nonzero integer $k$, the Mordell curve $y^2 = x^3 + k$ has genus one, so the equation has only finitely many solutions in integers.

If $F(x, y)$ is an irreducible binary form with rational integer coefficients of degree $d \ge 3$ and $m$ is a nonzero integer, the curve $F(x, y) = m$ has $d \ge 3$ points at infinity, so the Thue equation $F(x, y) = m$ has only finitely many integer solutions. This special case had been proved by Axel Thue in 1909.

== Proof outline ==
Suppose that $C$ has infinitely many integral points. Because their coordinates are integers, their heights tend to infinity, and at some place of $S$ they must accumulate at one of the points at infinity. The integral points then provide unusually good approximations to an algebraic point, with an approximation exponent bounded below by a constant depending on the curve.

When $g \ge 1$, Siegel embedded $C$ in its Jacobian variety $J$. By the Mordell–Weil theorem, the group $J(K)$ is finitely generated, so the quotient $J(K)/mJ(K)$ is finite for every integer $m \ge 2$. Consequently the integral points lift to rational points on finitely many unramified coverings of $C$, all defined over a fixed finite extension of $K$ by the Chevalley–Weil theorem. On these coverings the heights of the lifted points are smaller by a factor of about $m^2$, while the quality of approximation to the points at infinity is essentially unchanged. For $m$ large, the approximations become better than the Thue–Siegel–Roth theorem permits, which is a contradiction.

When $g = 0$ and $n \ge 3$, the problem reduces to the finiteness of solutions of unit equations $u + v = 1$ in $S$-units, which also follows from diophantine approximation.

== History ==
In 1926, in a note published under the pseudonym "X", Siegel proved that the hyperelliptic equation $y^2 = f(x)$, where $f$ is a polynomial with at least three simple roots, has only finitely many integer solutions. He did so by reducing the equation to finitely many Thue equations.

In 1929, Siegel proved the theorem in general by combining his improvement of Thue's theorem on diophantine approximation with the Mordell–Weil theorem from diophantine geometry. He needed the theorem in the form proved by André Weil in his 1928 thesis, which applies to the Jacobian variety of a curve of arbitrary genus. An English translation of the paper, with commentary, appeared in 2014.

Serge Lang gave a general formulation of the theorem in terms of $S$-integral points in 1960. In 2002, Pietro Corvaja and Umberto Zannier gave a new proof based on the subspace theorem, which avoids the use of Jacobians and of the Mordell–Weil theorem.

== Effective versions ==
Siegel's proof does not yield an upper bound for the height of the integral points, because the Thue–Siegel–Roth theorem it relies on is ineffective. Effective versions are known in several cases through Baker's method of linear forms in logarithms. Alan Baker gave effective bounds for the solutions of the hyperelliptic equation $y^2 = f(x)$ in 1969, and Baker and John Coates extended this to all curves of genus one in 1970. Unit equations, and hence curves of genus zero with at least three points at infinity, can also be treated effectively by Baker's method. For general curves of genus at least two, an effective version of Siegel's theorem is still unknown.

== See also ==
- Diophantine geometry
- Faltings' theorem
- Mordell–Weil theorem
- Thue–Siegel–Roth theorem
- Thue equation
- Mordell curve
