= Michel Raynaud =

French mathematician

- Born: 16 June 1938; Riom, France
- Died: 10 March 2018 (aged 79); Rueil-Malmaison, France
- Education: Paris-Sud 11 University
- Known for: Abhyankar's conjecture Manin–Mumford conjecture Raynaud surface Raynaud's isogeny theorem
- Awards: Cole Prize (1995); Prize Ampère (1987)
- Scientific career
- Fields: Mathematics
- Workplaces: Paris-Sud 11 University
- Doctoral advisor: Alexander Grothendieck

Michel Raynaud (French: [ʁɛno]; 16 June 1938 – 10 March 2018) was a French mathematician working in algebraic geometry and a professor at Paris-Sud 11 University.

== Early life and education ==
He was born in Riom, France as a single son to a modest household. His father was a carpenter and his mother cleaned houses. He attended the local primary school at Châtel Guyon and Riom, and attended high school at the boarding school in Clermont-Ferrand.

Raynaud entered the École normale supérieure where he studied from 1958 to 1962, while being first of the class in the "agrégation" exam where the new high school teachers were selected in 1961. In 1962, he entered the French National Centre for Scientific Research where he studied together with his future wife Michèle Chaumartin. Both had the same doctoral advisor in Alexander Grothendieck. Raynaud received his doctoral degree in 1967.

== Career ==
Raynaud was hired as professor at the Orsay Faculty of Sciences in Paris where he was employed until 2001, when he retired.

Raynaud died on 10 March 2018 in Rueil-Malmaison, France.

== Research ==
In 1983, Raynaud published a proof of the Manin–Mumford conjecture. In 1985, he proved Raynaud's isogeny theorem on Faltings heights of isogenous elliptic curves. With David Harbater and following the work of Jean-Pierre Serre, Raynaud proved Abhyankar's conjecture in 1994.

The Raynaud surface was named after him by William E. Lang in 1979.

== Honors and awards ==
In 1970 Raynaud was an invited speaker at the International Congress of Mathematicians in Nice. In 1987 he received the Prize Ampère from the French Academy of Sciences. In 1995 he received the Cole Prize, together with David Harbater, for his solution of the Abhyankar conjecture.

== Personal life ==
He practiced skiing (especially in Val-d'Isère), tennis, and rock climbing (in Fontainebleau). He was married to the mathematician Michèle Raynaud (née Chaumartin) who also worked with Alexander Grothendieck.
