= Faltings' theorem =

Curves of genus > 1 over the rationals have only finitely many rational points

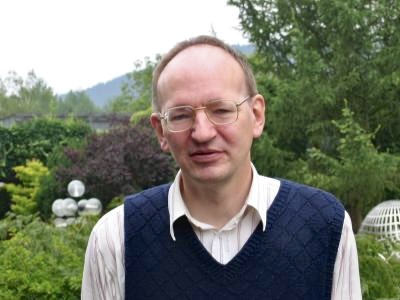
- Gerd Faltings
- Field: Arithmetic geometry
- Conjectured by: Louis Mordell
- Conjectured in: 1922
- First proof by: Gerd Faltings
- First proof in: 1983
- Generalizations: Bombieri–Lang conjecture Mordell–Lang conjecture
- Consequences: Siegel's theorem on integral points

Faltings' theorem is a result in arithmetic geometry, according to which a non-singular algebraic curve of genus greater than 1 over the field $\mathbb{Q}$ of rational numbers has only finitely many rational points. This was conjectured in 1922 by Louis Mordell, and known as the Mordell conjecture until its 1983 proof by Gerd Faltings. The conjecture was later generalized by replacing $\mathbb{Q}$ by any number field.

== Background ==
Let $C$ be a non-singular algebraic curve of genus $g$ over $\mathbb{Q}$. Then the set of rational points on $C$ may be determined as follows:

- When $g=0$, there are either no points or infinitely many. In such cases, $C$ may be handled as a conic section.
- When $g=1$, if there are any points, then $C$ is an elliptic curve and its rational points form a finitely generated abelian group. (This is Mordell's Theorem, later generalized to the Mordell–Weil theorem.) Moreover, Mazur's torsion theorem restricts the structure of the torsion subgroup.
- When $g>1$, according to Faltings' theorem, $C$ has only a finite number of rational points.

== Proofs ==
Igor Shafarevich conjectured that there are only finitely many isomorphism classes of abelian varieties of fixed dimension and fixed polarization degree over a fixed number field with good reduction outside a fixed finite set of places. Aleksei Parshin showed that Shafarevich's finiteness conjecture would imply the Mordell conjecture, using what is now called Parshin's trick.

Gerd Faltings proved Shafarevich's finiteness conjecture using a known reduction to a case of the Tate conjecture, together with tools from algebraic geometry, including the theory of Néron models. The main idea of Faltings' proof is the comparison of Faltings heights and naive heights via Siegel modular varieties. (Note: "Faltings relates the two notions of height by means of the Siegel moduli space.... It is the main idea of the proof." Bloch, Spencer (1984). "The Proof of the Mordell Conjecture". The Mathematical Intelligencer. 6 (2): 44. doi:10.1007/BF03024155. S2CID 306251.)

=== Later proofs ===
- Paul Vojta gave a proof based on Diophantine approximation. Enrico Bombieri found a more elementary variant of Vojta's proof.
- David Masser and Gisbert Wüstholz gave new proofs of the Tate, Shafarevich, and Mordell conjectures using transcendence theory.
- Brian Lawrence and Akshay Venkatesh gave a proof based on p-adic Hodge theory, borrowing also some of the easier ingredients of Faltings' original proof.
- Junyi Xie and Ziquan Yang used Yuan's nonarchimedean equidistribution theorem to give a new proof of Faltings' isogeny theorem from Tate's theorem over finite fields. Jit Wu Yap used this equidistribution theorem to prove the finiteness of an isogeny class. These results provide a new proof of the Mordell conjecture following Faltings' route.

== Consequences ==
Faltings' 1983 paper had as consequences a number of statements which had previously been conjectured:

- The Mordell conjecture that a curve of genus greater than 1 over a number field has only finitely many rational points;
- Tate's isogeny theorem that abelian varieties with isomorphic Tate modules (as $\mathbb{Q}_{\ell}$-modules with Galois action) are isogenous.

A sample application of Faltings' theorem is to a weak form of Fermat's Last Theorem: for any fixed $n\ge 4$ there are at most finitely many primitive integer solutions (pairwise coprime solutions) to $a^n+b^n=c^n$, since for such $n$ the Fermat curve $x^n+y^n=1$ has genus greater than 1.

== Generalizations ==
Because of the Mordell–Weil theorem, Faltings' theorem can be reformulated as a statement about the intersection of a curve $C$ with a finitely generated subgroup $\Gamma$ of an abelian variety $A$. Generalizing by replacing $A$ by a semiabelian variety, $C$ by an arbitrary subvariety of $A$, and $\Gamma$ by an arbitrary finite-rank subgroup of $A$ leads to the Mordell–Lang conjecture, which was proved in 1995 by McQuillan following work of Laurent, Raynaud, Hindry, Vojta, and Faltings.

Another higher-dimensional generalization of Faltings' theorem is the Bombieri–Lang conjecture that if $X$ is a pseudo-canonical variety (i.e., a variety of general type) over a number field $k$, then $X(k)$ is not Zariski dense in $X$. Even more general conjectures have been put forth by Paul Vojta.

The Mordell conjecture for function fields was proved by Yuri Ivanovich Manin and by Hans Grauert. In 1990, Robert F. Coleman found and fixed a gap in Manin's proof.
