= Bombieri–Lang conjecture =

Unsolved conjecture in geometry

In arithmetic geometry, the Bombieri–Lang conjecture is an unsolved problem conjectured by Enrico Bombieri and Serge Lang about the Zariski density of the set of rational points of an algebraic variety of general type.

== Statement ==
The weak Bombieri–Lang conjecture for surfaces states that if $X$ is a smooth surface of general type defined over a number field $k$, then the $k$-rational points of $X$ do not form a dense set in the Zariski topology on $X$.

The general form of the Bombieri–Lang conjecture states that if $X$ is a positive-dimensional algebraic variety of general type defined over a number field $k$, then the $k$-rational points of $X$ do not form a dense set in the Zariski topology.

The refined form of the Bombieri–Lang conjecture states that if $X$ is an algebraic variety of general type defined over a number field $k$, then there is a dense open subset $U$ of $X$ such that for all number field extensions $k'$ over $k$, the set of $k'$-rational points in $U$ is finite.

== History ==
The Bombieri–Lang conjecture was independently posed by Enrico Bombieri and Serge Lang. In a 1980 lecture at the University of Chicago, Enrico Bombieri posed a problem about the degeneracy of rational points for surfaces of general type. Independently in a series of papers starting in 1971, Serge Lang conjectured a more general relation between the distribution of rational points and algebraic hyperbolicity, formulated in the "refined form" of the Bombieri–Lang conjecture.

== Generalizations and implications ==
The Bombieri–Lang conjecture is an analogue for surfaces of Faltings' theorem, which states that algebraic curves of genus greater than one only have finitely many rational points.

If true, the Bombieri–Lang conjecture would resolve the Erdős–Ulam problem, as it would imply that there do not exist dense subsets of the Euclidean plane all of whose pairwise distances are rational.

In 1997, Lucia Caporaso, Barry Mazur, Joe Harris, and Patricia Pacelli showed that the Bombieri–Lang conjecture implies a uniform boundedness conjecture for rational points: there is a constant $B_{g,d}$ depending only on $g$ and $d$ such that the number of rational points of any genus $g$ curve $X$ over any degree $d$ number field is at most $B_{g,d}$.
