= Michel Waldschmidt =

French mathematician

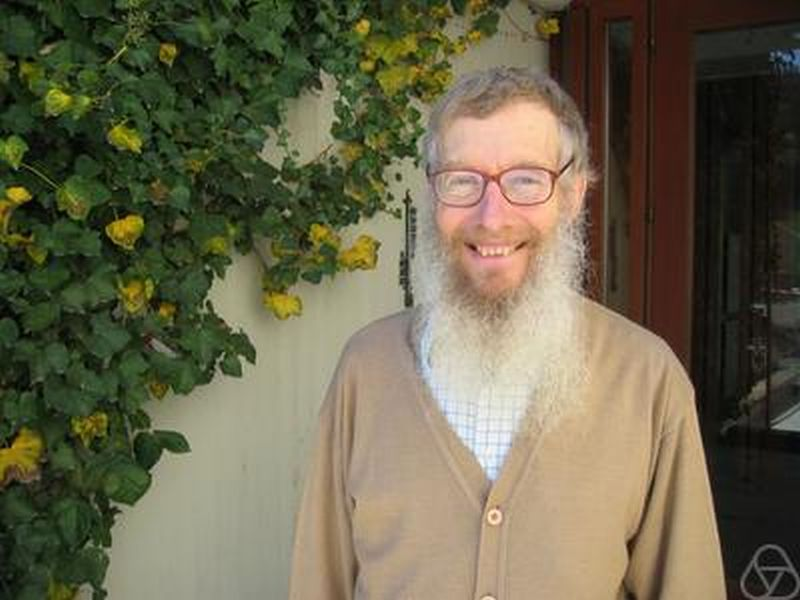
Michel Waldschmidt in 2007 at Oberwolfach

Michel Waldschmidt (born June 17, 1946 at Nancy, France) is a French mathematician, specializing in number theory, especially transcendental numbers.

== Career ==
Waldschmidt was educated at Lycée Henri Poincaré and the University of Nancy until 1968. In 1972 he defended his thesis, titled Indépendance algébrique de nombres transcendants (Algebraic independence of transcendental numbers) and directed by Jean Fresnel, the University of Bordeaux.

He was a research associate of the CNRS at the University of Bordeaux in 1971–1972. He was then a lecturer at Paris-Sud 11 University in 1972–1973. He became a lecturer at the University of Paris VI (Pierre et Marie Curie) and then became a professor there in 1973. He is a member of the Institut de mathématiques de Jussieu.

Waldschmidt was also a visiting professor at places including the École normale supérieure.

From 2001 to 2004 he was president of the Mathematical Society of France. He is a member of several mathematical societies, including the EMS, the AMS and Ramanujan Mathematical Society.

== Awards and honors ==
Waldschmidt was awarded the Albert Châtelet Prize in 1974, the CNRS Silver Medal in 1978, the Marquet Prize of Academy of Sciences in 1980 and the Special Award of the Hardy–Ramanujan Society in 1986. In 2021, he was awarded the Bertrand Russell Prize by the American Mathematical Society.

== Selected publications ==
- Diophantine approximation on linear algebraic groups. Springer, 2000 ISBN 978-3-540-66785-8
- Nombres transcendants, Lecture Notes in Mathematics, vol. 402, 1974, Springer ISBN 978-3-540-06874-7
- Nombres transcendants et groupes algébriques, Astérisque, vol. 69/70, 1979, 2^{e} tirage 1987
- Transcendence Methods, Queens Papers in Pure and Applied Mathematics, 1979
- With J.-M. Luck, P. Moussa, C. Itzykson (eds.), From Number Theory to Physics, 1995
