= Wolfgang M. Schmidt =

Austrian mathematician

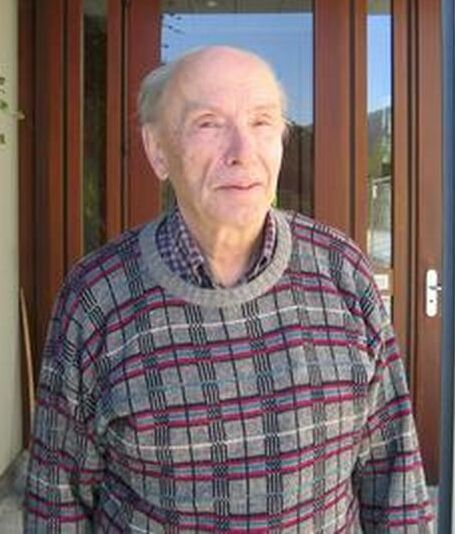
- Born: 3 October 1933 (age 93); Vienna, Austria
- Education: University of Vienna
- Known for: Subspace theorem Davenport–Schmidt theorem
- Scientific career
- Fields: Mathematics, Number Theory
- Workplaces: University of Colorado at Boulder
- Doctoral advisor: Edmund Hlawka

Wolfgang M. Schmidt (born 3 October 1933) is an Austrian mathematician working in the area of number theory. He studied mathematics at the University of Vienna, where he received his PhD, which was supervised by Edmund Hlawka, in 1955. Wolfgang Schmidt is a Professor Emeritus at the University of Colorado at Boulder and a member of the Austrian Academy of Sciences and the Polish Academy of Sciences.

== Career ==
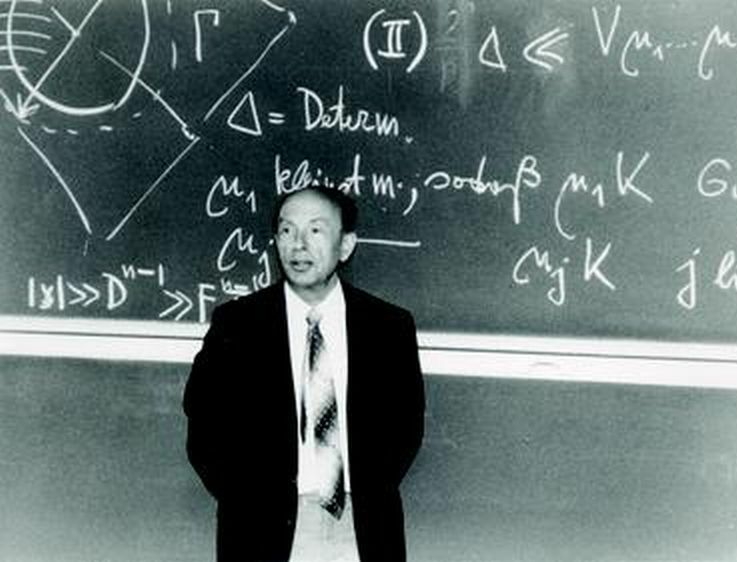
Schmidt in 1987

He was awarded the eighth Frank Nelson Cole Prize in Number Theory for work on Diophantine approximation. He is known for his subspace theorem.

In 1960, he proved that every normal number in base r is normal in base s if and only if log r / log s is a rational number. He also proved the existence of T numbers. His series of papers on irregularities of distribution can be seen in J.Beck and W.Chen, Irregularities of Distribution, Cambridge University Press. Schmidt is in a small group of number theorists who have been invited to address the International Congress of Mathematicians three times. The others are Iwaniec, Shimura, and Tate.

In 1986, Schmidt received the Humboldt Research Award. In 2001, he was awarded the Sierpiński Medal, and in 2003, he received the Austrian Decoration for Science and Art. Schmidt holds honorary doctorates from the University of Ulm, the Sorbonne, the University of Waterloo, the University of Marburg and the University of York. In 2012 he became a fellow of the American Mathematical Society.

== Books ==
- Diophantine approximation. Lecture Notes in Mathematics 785. Springer. (1980 [1996 with minor corrections])
- Diophantine approximations and Diophantine equations, Lecture Notes in Mathematics, Springer Verlag 2000
- Equations Over Finite Fields: An Elementary Approach, 2nd edition, Kendrick Press 2004
