= Gerd Faltings =

German mathematician (born 1954)

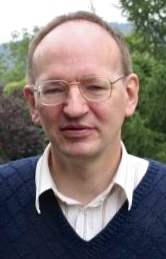
- Faltings in 2005
- Born: 28 July 1954 (age 72); Gelsenkirchen-Buer, North Rhine-Westphalia, West Germany
- Education: University of Münster (Dip, Dr. rer. nat.)
- Known for: Almost ring; Faltings height; Faltings' annihilator theorem; Faltings' theorem; Faltings' product theorem
- Spouse: Angelika Tschimmel (m. 1984; died 2011)
- Awards: Dannie Heineman Prize (1983); Fields Medal (1986); ICM Speaker (1986, 1994); Guggenheim Fellowship (1988); Leibniz Prize (1996); Von Staudt Prize (2008); Heinz Gumin Prize (2010); King Faisal International Prize (2014); Shaw Prize (2015); ForMemRS (2016); Cantor Medal (2017); Pour le Mérite (2024); Abel Prize (2026)
- Scientific career
- Fields: Mathematics
- Workplaces: Max Planck Institute for Mathematics; University of Bonn; Princeton University; University of Wuppertal
- Theses: Über Macaulayfizierung (1978); Formale Geometrie und homogene Räume (1980)
- Doctoral advisor: Hans-Joachim Nastold
- Doctoral students: Michael J. Larsen; Shinichi Mochizuki; Wiesława Nizioł; Nikolai Durov

Gerd Faltings (German: [ɡɛʁt ˈfaltɪŋs]; born 28 July 1954) is a German mathematician known for his work in arithmetic geometry. He was awarded the Fields Medal in 1986 for his proofs of the Mordell conjecture and several related conjectures. He won the Abel Prize in 2026 for these achievements.

== Education ==
Gerd Faltings was born on 28 July 1954 in Gelsenkirchen-Buer, West Germany. From 1972 to 1978, Faltings studied mathematics and physics at the University of Münster. Interrupted by 15 months of obligatory military service, he received his Dr. rer. nat. in mathematics in 1978.

== Career and research ==
In 1981, he obtained the venia legendi in mathematics from the University of Münster, where he was an assistant professor. He was a professor at the University of Wuppertal from 1982 to 1984 and Princeton University from 1985 to 1994. In the autumn of 1988 and in the academic year 1992–1993, he was a visiting scholar at the Institute for Advanced Study.

He was awarded the Fields Medal in 1986 for proving the Tate conjecture for Abelian varieties over number fields, the Shafarevich conjecture for Abelian varieties over number fields and the Mordell conjecture, which states that any non-singular projective curve of genus g > 1 defined over a number field K contains only finitely many K-rational points.

In 1994, as an invited speaker at the International Congress of Mathematicians he gave a talk Mumford-Stabilität in der algebraischen Geometrie (lit. 'Mumford stability in algebraic geometry'). Extending methods of Paul Vojta, he proved the Mordell–Lang conjecture, which is a generalization of the Mordell conjecture. Together with Gisbert Wüstholz, he re-proved Roth's theorem, for which Roth had been awarded the Fields medal in 1958.

He returned to Germany the same year, and from 1994 to 2018, he was a director of the Max Planck Institute for Mathematics in Bonn. In 1996, he received the Gottfried Wilhelm Leibniz Prize of the Deutsche Forschungsgemeinschaft.

Faltings has been the formal supervisor of over a dozen PhD students, including Shinichi Mochizuki, Wiesława Nizioł, and Nikolai Durov.

On 19 March 2026, the Norwegian Academy of Science and Letters announced Faltings as the winner of the Abel Prize, "for introducing powerful tools in arithmetic geometry and resolving long-standing diophantine conjectures of Mordell and Lang." He is the first German mathematician to have received both the Fields Medal and the Abel Prize.

== Personal life ==
Faltings married Angelika Tschimmel in 1984; she died in 2011.

== Awards and honours ==
- Dannie Heineman Prize (1983)
- Fields Medal (1986)
- Guggenheim Fellowship (1988/89)
- Gottfried Wilhelm Leibniz Prize (1996)
- von Staudt Prize (2008)
- Heinz Gumin Prize (2010)
- King Faisal International Prize (2014)
- Shaw Prize (2015)
- Foreign Member of the Royal Society (2016)
- Cantor Medal (2017)
- National Academy of Sciences International Member (2018)
- Pour le Mérite for Sciences and Arts (2024)
- Abel Prize (2026)
