= S-unit =

Topic in algebraic number theory

In mathematics, in the field of algebraic number theory, an S-unit generalises the idea of unit of the ring of integers of the field. Many of the results which hold for units are also valid for S-units.

== Definition ==
Let K be a number field with ring of integers R. Let S be a finite set of prime ideals of R. An element x of K is an S-unit if the principal fractional ideal (x) is a product of primes in S (to positive or negative powers). For the ring of rational integers Z one may take S to be a finite set of prime numbers and define an S-unit to be a rational number whose numerator and denominator are divisible only by the primes in S.

== Properties ==
The S-units form a multiplicative group containing the units of R.

Dirichlet's unit theorem holds for S-units: the group of S-units is finitely generated, with rank (maximal number of multiplicatively independent elements) equal to r + s, where r is the rank of the unit group and s = |S|.

== S-unit equation ==
The S-unit equation is a Diophantine equation

u + v = 1

with u and v restricted to being S-units of K (or more generally, elements of a finitely generated subgroup of the multiplicative group of any field of characteristic zero). The number of solutions of this equation is finite and the solutions are effectively determined using estimates for linear forms in logarithms as developed in transcendental number theory. A variety of Diophantine equations are reducible in principle to some form of the S-unit equation: a notable example is Siegel's theorem on integral points on elliptic curves, and more generally superelliptic curves of the form y^{n} = f(x).

A computational solver for S-unit equation is available in the software SageMath.
