= Subspace theorem =

Points of small height in projective space lie in a finite number of hyperplanes

In mathematics, the subspace theorem says that points of small height in projective space lie in a finite number of hyperplanes. It is a result obtained by Wolfgang M. Schmidt (1972).

== Statement ==
The subspace theorem states that if L_{1},...,L_{n} are linearly independent linear forms in n variables with algebraic coefficients and if ε>0 is any given real number, then the non-zero integer points x with

$$|L_1(x)\cdots L_n(x)|<|x|^{-\epsilon}$$

lie in a finite number of proper subspaces of Q^{n}.

A quantitative form of the theorem, which determines the number of subspaces containing all solutions, was also obtained by Schmidt, and the theorem was generalised by Schlickewei (1977) to allow more general absolute values on number fields.

== Applications ==
The theorem may be used to obtain results on Diophantine equations such as Siegel's theorem on integral points and solution of the S-unit equation.

=== A corollary on Diophantine approximation ===
The following corollary to the subspace theorem is often itself referred to as the subspace theorem. If a_{1},...,a_{n} are algebraic such that 1,a_{1},...,a_{n} are linearly independent over Q and ε>0 is any given real number, then there are only finitely many rational n-tuples (x_{1}/y,...,x_{n}/y) with

$$|a_i-x_i/y|<y^{-(1+1/n+\epsilon)},\quad i=1,\ldots,n.$$

The specialization n = 1 gives the Thue–Siegel–Roth theorem. One may also note that the exponent 1+1/n+ε is best possible by Dirichlet's theorem on diophantine approximation.
