= Paul Vojta =

American mathematician

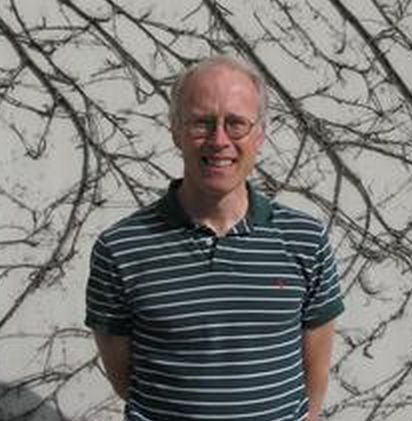
- Born: September 30, 1957 (age 68)
- Education: Harvard University; University of Minnesota
- Known for: Vojta's conjecture
- Awards: Cole Prize (1992); Putnam Fellow
- Scientific career
- Fields: Mathematics
- Workplaces: University of California, Berkeley
- Doctoral advisor: Barry Mazur

Paul Alan Vojta (born September 30, 1957) is an American mathematician, known for his work in number theory on Diophantine geometry and Diophantine approximation.

== Contributions ==
In formulating Vojta's conjecture, he pointed out the possible existence of parallels between the Nevanlinna theory of complex analysis, and diophantine analysis in the circle of ideas around the Mordell conjecture and abc conjecture. This suggested the importance of the integer solutions (affine space) aspect of diophantine equations.

Vojta wrote the .dvi-previewer xdvi. He also wrote a vi clone.

== Education and career ==
He was an undergraduate student at the University of Minnesota, where he became a Putnam Fellow in 1977, and a doctoral student at Harvard University (1983). He currently is a professor in the Department of Mathematics at the University of California, Berkeley.

== Awards and honors ==
In 2012 he became a fellow of the American Mathematical Society.

== Selected publications ==
- Diophantine Approximations and Value Distribution Theory, Lecture Notes in Mathematics 1239, Springer Verlag, 1987, ISBN 978-3-540-17551-3
