= Aise Johan de Jong =

Dutch mathematician

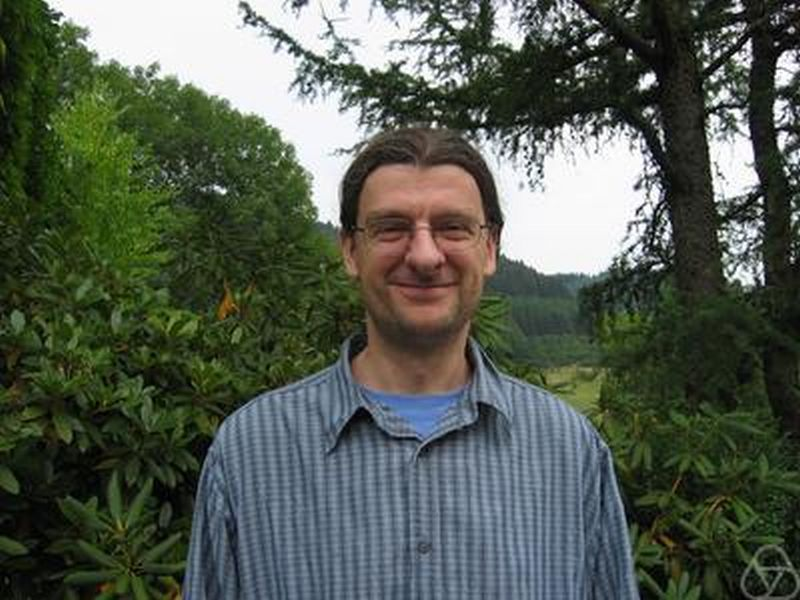
- De Jong at Oberwolfach, 2004
- Born: 30 January 1966 (age 60); Bruges, Belgium
- Education: Radboud University Nijmegen; Leiden University
- Known for: Alterations; Stacks Project
- Awards: Cole Prize (2000); EMS Prize (1996)
- Scientific career
- Fields: Mathematics
- Workplaces: Columbia University; Massachusetts Institute of Technology; Princeton University; Harvard University; Max Planck Institute for Mathematics
- Thesis: Moduli of abelian varieties and Dieudonné modules of finite group schemes (1992)
- Doctoral advisor: Frans Oort; Joseph H. M. Steenbrink
- Doctoral students: Bhargav Bhatt; Kiran Kedlaya

Aise Johan de Jong (born 30 January 1966) is a Dutch mathematician and professor of mathematics at Columbia University. His research interests include arithmetic geometry and algebraic geometry. He maintains the Stacks Project.

== Early life and education ==
De Jong was born in Bruges, Belgium on 30 January 1966. He attended the Christelijk Gymnasium Sorghvliet in The Hague, Netherlands. He obtained his master's degree at Leiden University in 1987, under the supervision of Antonius Van de Ven. He earned his Ph.D. cum laude at the Radboud University Nijmegen in 1992, under the supervision of Frans Oort and Joseph H. M. Steenbrink.

== Career ==
De Jong spent 1 year as a visitor at the Max Planck Institute for Mathematics, 3 months as a visitor at Bielefeld University, and then 3 years as a fellow at the Royal Netherlands Academy of Arts and Sciences stationed at Utrecht University. He was a Benjamin Peirce Assistant Professor at Harvard University from 1995 to 1996. He was a professor of mathematics at Princeton University from 1996 to 1998 and then worked at the Massachusetts Institute of Technology from 1998 to 2005. He moved to Columbia University as a professor of mathematics in 2005.

== Work ==
In 1996, de Jong developed his theory of alterations which was used by Fedor Bogomolov and Tony Pantev (1996) and Dan Abramovich and de Jong (1997) to prove resolution of singularities in characteristic 0 and to prove a weaker result for varieties of all dimensions in characteristic p which is strong enough to act as a substitute for resolution for many purposes.

In 2005, de Jong started the Stacks Project, "an open source textbook and reference work on algebraic stacks and the algebraic geometry needed to define them." The book that the project has generated currently runs to more than 7500 pages as of July 2022.

== Awards and honors ==
In 1998 he was an Invited Speaker of the International Congress of Mathematicians in Berlin. He won the Cole Prize in 2000 for his theory of alterations. In the same year, De Jong became a correspondent of the Royal Netherlands Academy of Arts and Sciences. In 2022 he received the Leroy P. Steele Prize for Mathematical Exposition.

== Personal life ==
De Jong lives in New York City with his wife, Cathy O'Neil, and their three sons.

== Selected works ==
- De Jong, A. J. (1996). "Smoothness, semi-stability and alterations". Publications Mathématiques de l'IHÉS. 83: 51–93. doi:10.1007/bf02698644. S2CID 53581802.
- The Stacks Project
