= Mahler's compactness theorem =

Characterizes sets of lattices that are bounded in a certain sense

In mathematics, Mahler's compactness theorem, proved by Kurt Mahler (1946), is a foundational result on lattices in Euclidean space, characterising sets of lattices that are 'bounded' in a certain definite sense. Looked at another way, it explains the ways in which a lattice could degenerate (go off to infinity) in a sequence of lattices. In intuitive terms it says that this is possible in just two ways: becoming coarse-grained with a fundamental domain that has ever larger volume; or containing shorter and shorter vectors. It is also called his selection theorem, following an older convention used in naming compactness theorems, because they were formulated in terms of sequential compactness (the possibility of selecting a convergent subsequence).

Let X be the space

$$\mathrm{GL}_n(\mathbb{R})/\mathrm{GL}_n(\mathbb{Z})$$

that parametrises lattices in $\mathbb{R}^n$, with its quotient topology. There is a well-defined function Δ on X, which is the absolute value of the determinant of a matrix – this is constant on the cosets, since an invertible integer matrix has determinant 1 or −1.

Mahler's compactness theorem states that a subset Y of X is relatively compact if and only if Δ is bounded on Y, and there is a neighbourhood N of 0 in $\mathbb{R}^n$ such that for all Λ in Y, the only lattice point of Λ in N is 0 itself.

The assertion of Mahler's theorem is equivalent to the compactness of the space of unit-covolume lattices in $\mathbb{R}^n$ whose systole is larger or equal than any fixed $\varepsilon>0$.

Mahler's compactness theorem was generalized to semisimple Lie groups by David Mumford; see Mumford's compactness theorem.
