= Emma Previato =

Italian–American mathematician

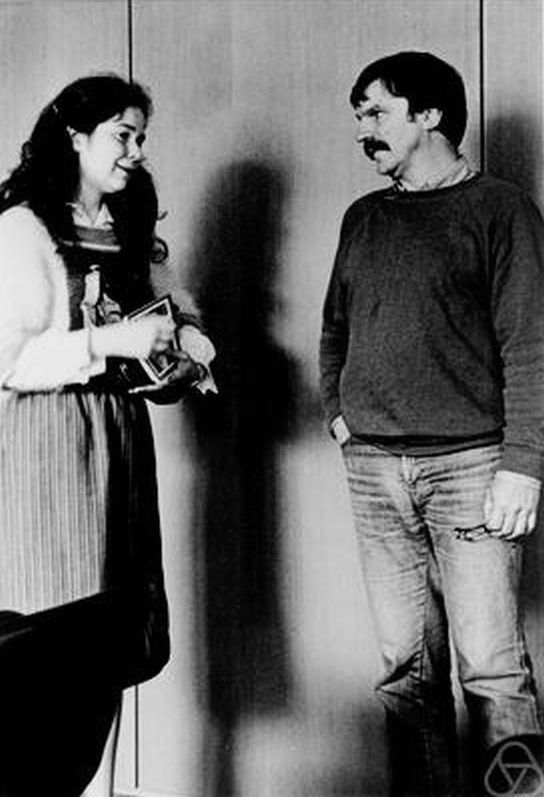
- With Jean-Louis Verdier, 1984 at the MFO
- Born: November 29, 1952; Badia Polesine, Italy
- Died: June 29, 2022 (aged 69); Boston, Massachusetts, United States
- Citizenship: United States
- Education: University of Padua (BS); Harvard University (PhD)
- Known for: Algebraic geometry, partial differential equations
- Awards: Fellow of the American Mathematical Society
- Scientific career
- Fields: Mathematics
- Workplaces: Boston University
- Thesis: Hyperelliptic Curves and Solitons (1983)
- Doctoral advisor: David Mumford

Emma Previato (November 29, 1952 – June 29, 2022) was an Italian–born American professor of mathematics at Boston University. Her research focused on algebraic geometry and partial differential equations.

== Career ==
Previato received her Ph.D. from Harvard University in 1983 under David Mumford. She was a faculty member at Boston University. She was the author or co-author of nearly 100 research articles. She served as editor or co-editor of 6 books, including Dictionary of Applied Math for Engineers and Scientists (2002, CRC Press).

Previato founded Boston University's chapters of the Mathematical Association of America and of the Association for Women in Mathematics.

== Awards and honors ==
In 2003, she received the Mathematical Association of America Northeastern Section's Award for Distinguished College or University Teaching of Mathematics for her work in and out of the classroom, especially her mentoring of students.

In 2012, Previato became a fellow of the American Mathematical Society.

== Personal life ==
Previato was born in Badia Polesine in 1952. She earned undergraduate and master's degrees from the University of Padua before beginning her PhD at Harvard.

== Selected publications ==
- Previato, Emma. Hyperelliptic quasiperiodic and soliton solutions of the nonlinear Schrödinger equation]. Duke Mathematical Journal 52 (1985), no. 2, 329–377. doi:10.1215/S0012-7094-85-05218-4
- Adams, M. R.; Harnad, J.; Previato, E. Isospectral Hamiltonian flows in finite and infinite dimensions. I. Generalized Moser systems and moment maps into loop algebras. Communications in Mathematical Physics 117 (1988), no. 3, 451–500. doi:10.1007/BF01223376
- Eilbeck, J. C.; Enolski, V. Z.; Matsutani, S.; Ônishi, Y.; Previato, E. Abelian functions for trigonal curves of genus three. International Mathematics Research Notices 2008, no. 1, Art. ID rnm 140, 38 pp.
- Kielanowski, Piotr; Odzijewicz, Anatol; Previato, Emma (2018-02-11). Geometric Methods in Physics XXXV: Workshop and Summer School, Bialowieza, Poland, June 26 - July 2, 2016. Trends in Mathematics (1st ed. 2018 ed.). Birkhäuser. ISBN 978-3-319-63593-4.
