= Encyclopedia of Mathematics =

Large reference work translated from Soviet source

- Website: encyclopediaofmath.org

The Encyclopedia of Mathematics (also EOM and formerly Encyclopaedia of Mathematics) is a large reference work in mathematics.

== Overview ==
The 2002 version contains more than 8,000 entries covering most areas of mathematics at a graduate level, and the presentation is technical in nature. The encyclopedia is edited by Michiel Hazewinkel and was published by Kluwer Academic Publishers until 2003, when Kluwer became part of Springer. The CD-ROM contains animations and three-dimensional objects.

The encyclopedia has been translated from the Soviet Matematicheskaya entsiklopediya (1977) originally edited by Ivan Matveevich Vinogradov and extended with comments and three supplements adding several thousand articles.

Until November 29, 2011, a static version of the encyclopedia could be browsed online free of charge. This URL now redirects to the new wiki incarnation of the EOM.

== Encyclopedia of Mathematics wiki ==
A new dynamic version of the encyclopedia is now available as a public wiki online. This new wiki is a collaboration between Springer and the European Mathematical Society. This new version of the encyclopedia includes the entire contents of the previous online version, but all entries can now be publicly updated to include the newest advancements in mathematics. All entries will be monitored for content accuracy by members of an editorial board selected by the European Mathematical Society.

== Versions ==
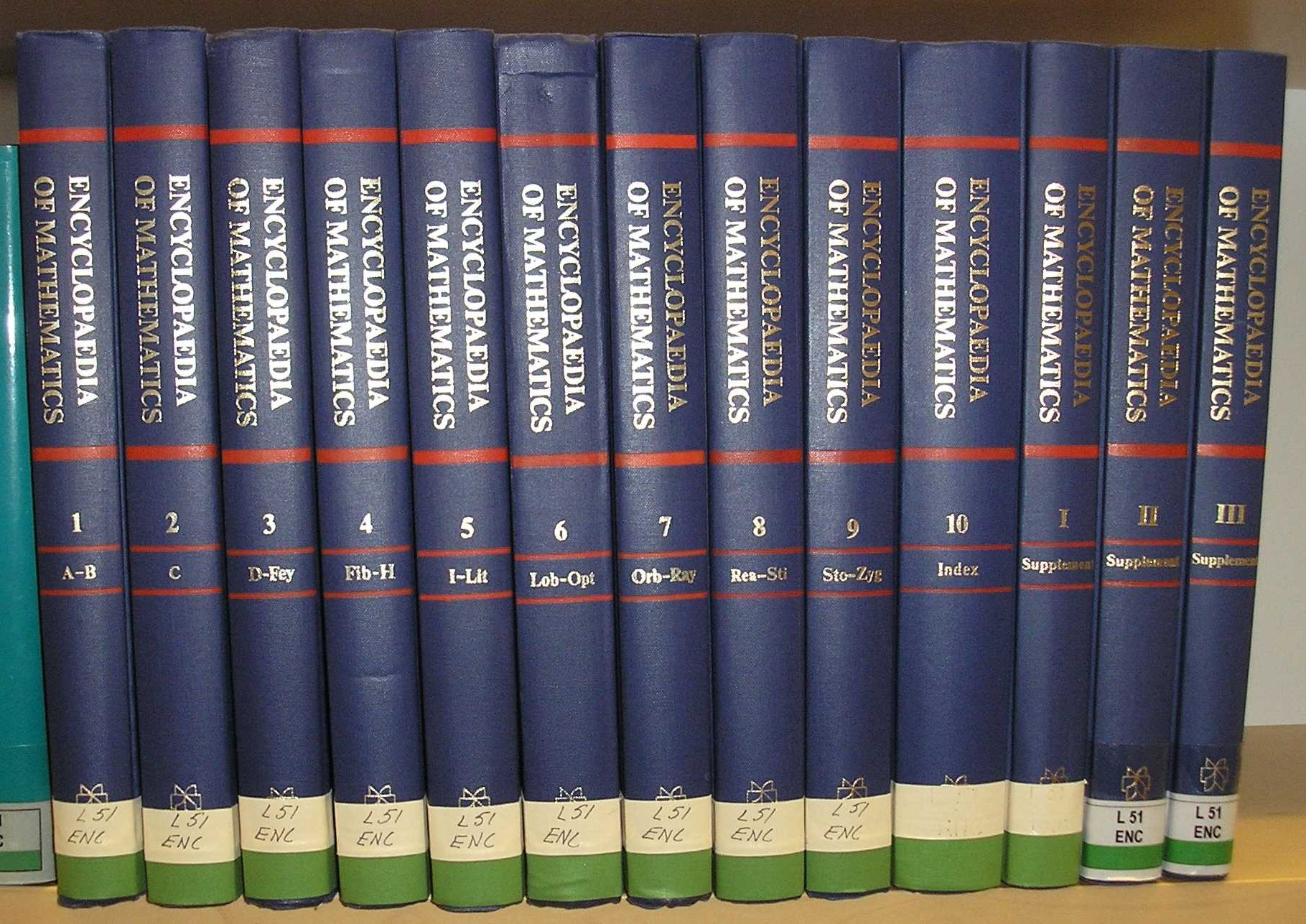
A complete set of Encyclopedia of Mathematics at a university library.

- Vinogradov, I. M. (Ed.), Matematicheskaya entsiklopediya, Moscow, Sov. Entsiklopediya, 1977.
- Hazewinkel, M. (Ed.), Encyclopaedia of Mathematics (set), Kluwer, 1994 (ISBN 1-55608-010-7).
  - Hazewinkel, M. (Ed.), Encyclopaedia of Mathematics, Vol. 1 (A–B), Kluwer, 1987 (ISBN 1-55608-000-X).
  - Hazewinkel, M. (Ed.), Encyclopaedia of Mathematics, Vol. 2 (C), Kluwer, 1988 (ISBN 1-55608-001-8).
  - Hazewinkel, M. (Ed.), Encyclopaedia of Mathematics, Vol. 3 (D–Fey), Kluwer, 1989 (ISBN 1-55608-002-6).
  - Hazewinkel, M. (Ed.), Encyclopaedia of Mathematics, Vol. 4 (Fib–H), Kluwer, 1989 (ISBN 1-55608-003-4).
  - Hazewinkel, M. (Ed.), Encyclopaedia of Mathematics, Vol. 5 (I–Lit), Kluwer, 1990 (ISBN 1-55608-004-2).
  - Hazewinkel, M. (Ed.), Encyclopaedia of Mathematics, Vol. 6 (Lob–Opt), Kluwer, 1990 (ISBN 1-55608-005-0).
  - Hazewinkel, M. (Ed.), Encyclopaedia of Mathematics, Vol. 7 (Orb–Ray), Kluwer, 1991 (ISBN 1-55608-006-9).
  - Hazewinkel, M. (Ed.), Encyclopaedia of Mathematics, Vol. 8 (Rea–Sti), Kluwer, 1992 (ISBN 1-55608-007-7).
  - Hazewinkel, M. (Ed.), Encyclopaedia of Mathematics, Vol. 9 (Sto–Zyg), Kluwer, 1993 (ISBN 1-55608-008-5).
  - Hazewinkel, M. (Ed.), Encyclopaedia of Mathematics, Vol. 10 (Index), Kluwer, 1994 (ISBN 1-55608-009-3).
  - Hazewinkel, M. (Ed.), Encyclopaedia of Mathematics, Supplement I, Kluwer, 1997 (ISBN 0-7923-4709-9).
  - Hazewinkel, M. (Ed.), Encyclopaedia of Mathematics, Supplement II, Kluwer, 2000 (ISBN 0-7923-6114-8).
  - Hazewinkel, M. (Ed.), Encyclopaedia of Mathematics, Supplement III, Kluwer, 2002 (ISBN 1-4020-0198-3).
- Hazewinkel, M. (Ed.), Encyclopaedia of Mathematics on CD-ROM, Kluwer, 1998 (ISBN 0-7923-4805-2).
- Encyclopedia of Mathematics, public wiki monitored by an editorial board under the management of the European Mathematical Society.

== See also ==
- Dictionary of Mathematics
- Encyclopedic Dictionary of Mathematics (EDM)
- List of online encyclopedias
