= Zhu Yi (figure skater) =

American-Chinese figure skater (born 2002)

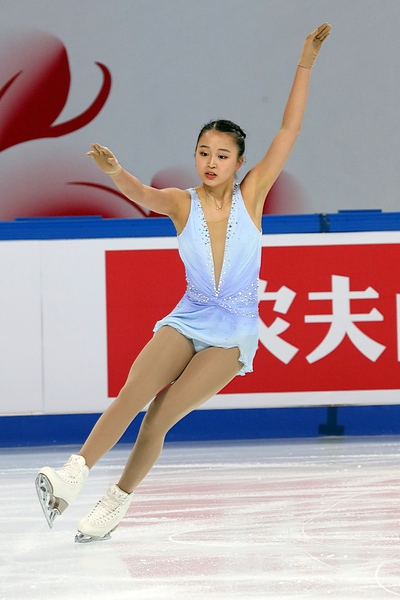
- Zhu at 2019 Cup of China

Personal information
- Native name: 朱易
- Born: Beverly Zhu; September 19, 2002 (age 24) Los Angeles, California, U.S.
- Home town: Beijing, China
- Height: 5 ft 5 in (1.65 m)

Figure skating career
- Country: China (since 2018); United States (until 2018)
- Coach: Fang Dan
- Began skating: 2010

Medal record
Chinese Championships
Bronze medal – third place	2026 Harbin	Singles

Zhu Yi (Chinese: 朱易; pinyin: Zhū Yì; born Beverly Zhu on September 19, 2002) is a figure skater who competes in women's singles. She is the 2026 Chinese national bronze medalist and the 2025 Asian Open silver medalist. She represented China at the 2022 Winter Olympics.

She initially competed for the United States and won the 2018 U.S. national novice title before representing China internationally. She has also competed in the final segment at four ISU Championships.

== Personal life ==
Zhu was born on September 19, 2002, in the Westwood neighbourhood of Los Angeles. Her parents, Cui Jie and Zhu Songchun, immigrated to the United States from China. Her father was a computer expert and professor at the University of California, Los Angeles, before moving to Peking University.

Zhu reportedly renounced her U.S. citizenship in 2018 after deciding to compete for China. She also changed her name from Beverly Zhu to Zhu Yi. Zhu is one of a number of foreign-born athletes who chose to become naturalized Chinese citizens or who gained permanent residency status in China to compete at the 2022 Winter Olympics. She currently resides in Beijing and is a student at Peking University. Since 2023, Zhu has been in a relationship with Olympic champion snowboarder Su Yiming, whom she met during the 2022 Winter Olympics.

Zhu's figure skating idol is American skater Amber Glenn. In addition to figure skating, she also enjoys playing the piano and drawing.

== Career ==
=== Early career ===
Zhu started skating at seven years old after her mother's friend's daughter started lessons. She narrowly missed qualifying to the U.S. National Championships in 2016 and 2017 after finishing fifth at Sectionals both seasons.

=== 2017–2018 season ===
Zhu placed second at the 2017–18 Pacific Coast Sectionals to qualify to the U.S. National Championships for the first time. She won the novice title in her Nationals debut at the 2018 U.S. Championships with a record score of 167.69 points.

=== 2018–2019 season: Switch to China ===
Zhu switched to representing her parents' native country of China in September 2018 as part of the country's "Morning Road" initiative to recruit top athletes leading up to the 2022 Winter Olympics in Beijing. She trained with five Chinese ice dancers in a group led by Chen Lu and five foreign coaches up through December.

In 2019, she received Chinese citizenship and began to represent China officially in figure skating events. Zhu placed fourth at the 2019 Chinese Championships in Harbin at the end of December. In February, she competed at the Sofia Trophy, where she won the bronze medal.

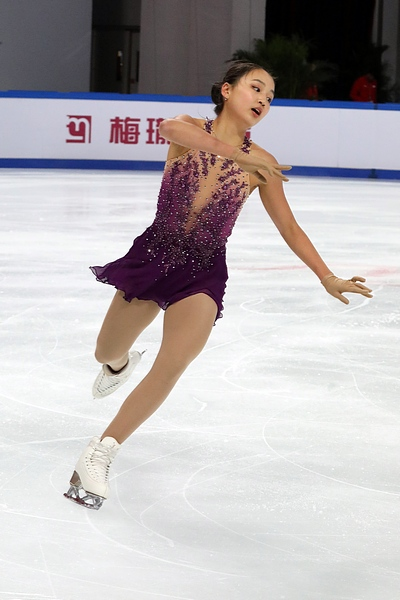
Yi at the 2019 Cup of China

=== 2019–2020 season: Senior international debut ===
Zhu was assigned to her first Grand Prix event, 2019 Cup of China, where she finished 11th. She then placed 14th at 2019 CS Golden Spin of Zagreb, 8th at the 2020 Mentor Toruń Cup, 13th at the 2020 Four Continents Championships, and 22nd at the 2020 World Junior Championships.

=== 2020–2021 season ===
Zhu was assigned to compete at the 2020 Skate Canada International, but the event was canceled as a result of the COVID-19 pandemic.

=== 2021–2022 season: Beijing Olympics ===
Zhu was assigned to compete at the 2021 Cup of China. The event was canceled on August 17 and subsequently replaced by the 2021 Gran Premio d'Italia, to which Zhu was reassigned. She began the season at the 2021 CS Asian Open Trophy, the Olympic test event, finishing in seventh place. She was ninth at the Gran Premio with a career-best score of 171.25 points, saying afterward "I didn't do everything, but I met my goals."

Zhu was chosen as the lone women's singles entry for the Chinese Olympic team over Chen Hongyi. Her selection drew criticism from Chinese skating fans, who felt stars like Chen and Texas-born Ashley Lin would be better suited. She began the 2022 Winter Olympics as the Chinese entry in the women's segments of the Olympic team event. With the women as the last of the four short program segments, the Chinese team was in third place going in, behind only the United States and ROC. Zhu fell on her jump combination, crashing into the boards of the rink, and singled a planned triple loop. As a result, she placed last in the segment with 47.03 points (below her season best of 60 points), dropping the Chinese team from third place to a tie for fifth. Afterward, she said that she was "upset and a little embarrassed." In the free skate, Zhu fell twice and again placed last in the segment. China finished fifth in the team event.

The performances drew considerable criticism from Weibo users, who also questioned her privileged background and family ties, lack of fluency in Mandarin Chinese, and selection over a native athlete. False rumours also spread that she would rather be interviewed by CNN than Chinese media. Following this, the microblogging company took steps to censor the backlash towards her and related hashtags. In the women's event later on, Zhu finished 26th in the short program and did not advance to the free skate. The performance however drew cheers and applause from the crowd midway through, and reportedly more sympathy on Weibo. In a Chinese media interview afterwards, Zhu said there might have been online comments that affected her at first, but she later adjusted.

=== 2022–2023 season ===
Zhu did not compete internationally during this season.

=== 2023–2024 season ===
Prior to the season, it was announced that Zhu had begun training in Beijing full-time and that former pair skater, Tong Jian, had become her new coach. She returned to international competition at the 2023 Cup of China, where she finished tenth.

At the 2024 Chinese Championships, Zhu came in eighteenth place. Despite this placement, Zhu was selected to compete at the 2024 Four Continents Championships, where she finished sixteenth. Zhu then ended the season by placing thirteenth at the 2024 National Winter Games.

=== 2024–2025 season ===
Zhu began the season by finishing eighth at the 2024 CS Denis Ten Memorial Challenge. She then went on to compete at the 2024 Cup of China, where she finished ninth. One week later, Zhu finished sixth at the 2025 Chinese Championships.

In February, Zhu competed at the 2025 Asian Winter Games in Harbin, where she finished in fifth place. One week later, she placed fifteenth at the 2025 Four Continents Championships in Seoul, South Korea.

=== 2025–2026 season ===
Zhu opened the season by winning the silver medal at the 2025 Asian Open Trophy and finishing fifth at the 2025 CS Denis Ten Memorial Challenge.

In October, it was announced that she had made a coaching change with Fang Dan becoming her new coach. Assigned to compete at the 2025 Cup of China, Zhu finished the event in eleventh place. A couple of months later, she won the bronze medal at the 2026 Chinese Championships. She was assigned to compete at the 2026 Four Continents where she placed 12th.

In February 2025, it was reported that the Beijing city government published a budget showing 48.14 million yuan (US$6.64 million) worth of funds for training Zhu and Eileen Gu. Their names were later redacted from the document, and mentions of this on the Chinese Internet were reportedly censored.

=== 2026–2027 season ===
Zhu began the season by placing ninth at the 2026 CS Denis Ten Memorial. She then competed at the 2026 Cup of China, scoring personal bests in all three segments of competition to place in seventh overall.

== Programs ==
Season	Short program	Free skating	Exhibition
2025–2026	Stand by Me by Ben E. King performed by Florence and the Machine choreo. by Benoît Richaud	Ghost; Unchained Melody/The Love Inside; Unchained Melody; Sam's Murder by Glen Ballard, Dave Stewart, Alex North, Bruce Joel Rubin, & Hy Zaret performed by Richard Fleeshman & Caissie Levy choreo. by Benoît Richaud	
2024–2025	Your Song by Elton John performed by Ellie Goulding arranged by Cédric Tour choreo. by Benoît Richaud	Look What I Found; I'll Never Love Again (from A Star Is Born) Lady Gaga choreo. by Derrick Delmore	A Person Like Me by Mao Buyi
2023–2024	Can't Help Falling in Love by Elvis Presley performed by Tommee Profitt choreo. by Derrick Delmore	Look What I Found; I'll Never Love Again (from A Star Is Born) Lady Gaga choreo. by Derrick Delmore; Sunset Boulevard by Andrew Lloyd Webber choreo. by Jeffrey Buttle	The Sound of Falling Snow by Lu Hu
2022–2023	Can't Help Falling in Love by Elvis Presley performed by Tommee Profitt choreo. by Derrick Delmore	Sunset Boulevard by Andrew Lloyd Webber choreo. by Jeffrey Buttle	
2021–2022	Paint It Black by The Rolling Stones performed by London Symphony Orchestra choreo. by Jeffrey Buttle	Sunset Boulevard by Andrew Lloyd Webber choreo. by Jeffrey Buttle	Yu Jian (遇见) by Stefanie Sun
2020–2021	Violin Concerto in D Major Op. 34 by Pyotr Ilyich Tchaikovsky choreo. by David Wilson		
2019–2020	The Winner Takes It All by ABBA performed by Sarah Dawn Finer choreo. by Derrick Delmore	Concerto in F by George Gershwin choreo. by Jeffrey Buttle	
2018–2019	Papa, Can You Hear Me? performed by Lea Michele		

== Competitive highlights ==
=== For China ===
- GP – Event of the ISU Grand Prix Series
- CS – Event of the ISU Challenger Series
- TBD – Assigned
- C – Event was cancelled

Competition placements at senior level
Season	2018–19	2019–20	2021–22	2023–24	2024–25	2025–26	2026–27
Winter Olympics			26th				
Winter Olympics (Team event)			5th				
Four Continents Championships		13th		16th	15th	11th	
Chinese Championships	4th			18th	6th	3rd	
GP Cup of China		11th	C	10th	9th	11th	8th
GP Italy			9th				
CS Asian Open Trophy			7th				
CS Denis Ten Memorial					8th	5th	9th
CS Golden Spin of Zagreb		14th					
Asian Open Trophy						2nd	
Asian Winter Games					5th		
Mentor Toruń Cup		8th					
National Winter Games				13th			

Competition placements at junior level
Season	2018–19	2019–20
World Junior Championships		22nd
Sofia Trophy	3rd	

== Detailed results ==
ISU personal best scores in the +5/-5 GOE System
Segment	Type	Score	Event
Total	TSS	180.47	2026 Cup of China
Short program	TSS	64.58	2026 Cup of China
Short program	TES	36.51	2026 Cup of China
Short program	PCS	28.07	2026 Cup of China
Free skating	TSS	115.89	2026 Cup of China
Free skating	TES	58.08	2025 CS Denis Ten Memorial Challenge
Free skating	PCS	59.33	2026 Four Continents Championships

=== Senior level ===
Results in the 2026–27 season
Date	Event	SP		FS		Total	
Date	Event	P	Score	P	Score	P	Score
Oct 8–11, 2026	(Kazakhstan) 2026 CS Denis Ten Memorial Challenge	10	56.75	9	100.39	9	157.14
Nov 6–8, 2026	2026 Cup of China	7	64.58	8	115.89	8	180.47

Results in the 2025–26 season
Date	Event	SP		FS		Total	
Date	Event	P	Score	P	Score	P	Score
Aug 1–5, 2025	(Philippines) 2025 Asian Open Trophy	1	61.94	2	98.69	2	160.63
Oct 1–4, 2025	(Kazakhstan) 2025 CS Denis Ten Memorial Challenge	5	52.75	4	108.08	5	160.83
Oct 24–26, 2025	2025 Cup of China	8	63.39	11	99.27	11	162.66
Dec 25–28, 2025	(China) 2026 Chinese Championships	3	67.49	5	125.99	3	193.48
Jan 21-25, 2026	(China) 2026 Four Continents Championships	10	58.99	12	115.01	12	174.00

2024–25 season
Date	Event	SP	FS	Total
February 19–23, 2025	2025 Four Continents Championships	15; 48.38	15; 103.55	15; 151.93
February 11–13, 2025	2025 Asian Winter Games	6; 62.90	5; 105.96	5; 168.86
November 28 – December 1, 2024	2025 Chinese Championships	8; 58.25	7; 114.71	6; 172.96
November 22–24, 2024	2024 Cup of China	10; 58.36	9; 107.68	9; 166.04
October 3–6, 2024	2024 CS Denis Ten Memorial Challenge	8; 55.45	9; 100.02	8; 155.47
2023–24 season
Date	Event	SP	FS	Total
February 1–4, 2024	2024 Four Continents Championships	15; 52.77	19; 86.75	16; 139.52
December 22–24, 2023	2024 Chinese Championships	18; 46.72	18; 84.81	18; 131.53
November 10–12, 2023	2023 Cup of China	11; 50.96	10; 103.62	10; 154.58
2021–22 season
Date	Event	SP	FS	Total
February 15–17, 2022	2022 Winter Olympics	26; 53.44	—	26; 53.44
February 4–7, 2022	2022 Winter Olympics — Team event	10; 47.03	5; 91.41	5T
November 5–7, 2021	2021 Gran Premio d'Italia	8; 60.00	9; 111.25	9; 171.25
October 13–17, 2021	2021 CS Asian Open Trophy	5; 52.88	6; 94.50	7; 147.38
2019–20 season
Date	Event	SP	FS	Total
March 2–8, 2020	2020 World Junior Championships	24; 50.43	22; 81.99	22; 132.42
February 4–9, 2020	2020 Four Continents Championships	12; 55.53	14; 99.88	13; 155.41
January 7–12, 2020	2020 Mentor Toruń Cup	10; 41.10	5; 79.93	8; 121.03
December 4–7, 2019	2019 CS Golden Spin of Zagreb	13; 49.23	13; 93.87	14; 143.10
November 8–10, 2019	2019 Cup of China	9; 53.19	11; 86.44	11; 139.63

=== Junior level ===
2018–19 season
Date	Event	Level	SP	FS	Total
February 5–10, 2019	2019 Sofia Trophy	Junior	3; 47.59	3; 88.05	3; 135.64
December 29–30, 2018	2019 Chinese Championships	Senior	4; 54.36	5; 91.71	4; 146.07
