= Mumford measure =

In mathematics, a Mumford measure is a measure on a supermanifold constructed from a bundle of relative dimension 1|1. It is named for David Mumford.
