= Frans Oort =

Dutch mathematician

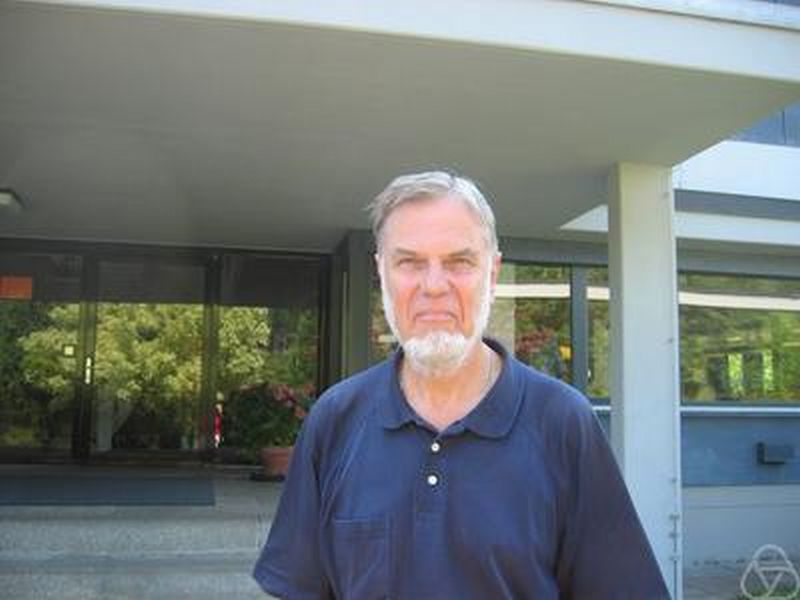
- Oort at Oberwolfach, 2004
- Born: 17 July 1935 (age 91); Bussum, Netherlands
- Education: University of Leiden
- Known for: André–Oort conjecture
- Scientific career
- Fields: Mathematics
- Doctoral advisors: Willem Titus van Est; Jaap Murre
- Doctoral students: Bas Edixhoven; Michiel Hazewinkel; Aise Johan de Jong; Hendrik Lenstra; Joseph Steenbrink

Frans Oort (born 17 July 1935) is a Dutch mathematician who specializes in algebraic geometry.

== Career ==
Oort studied from 1952 to 1958 at Leiden University, where he graduated with a thesis on elliptic curves. He received his doctorate in 1961 in Leiden from Willem Titus van Est and Jaap Murre with thesis Reducible and Multiple Algebraic Curves, but had previously studied under Jean-Pierre Serre in Paris and Aldo Andreotti in Pisa. Oort was from 1961 at the University of Amsterdam, where he became a professor in 1967. In 1977, until his retirement in 2000, he was a professor at Utrecht University.

He was a visiting scholar at several academic institutions, including Harvard University (1966/67) and Aarhus University (1972/73). In 2008 he was the Eilenberg Professor at Columbia University.

His doctoral students include Bas Edixhoven, Michiel Hazewinkel, Aise Johan de Jong, Hendrik Lenstra and Joseph Steenbrink.

== Research ==
Oort's research deals with, among other topics, abelian varieties and their moduli. In 1994, he formulated what is now known as the André–Oort conjecture (generalizing a conjecture made in 1989 by Yves André). In 2000 Oort proved a conjecture made by Grothendieck in 1970.

== Awards and honors ==
In 1962, Oort made a short contribution Multiple algebraic curves at the International Congress of Mathematicians in Stockholm, but was not an invited speaker. In 2011 he was elected a member of Academia Europaea. In July 2013, he gave a talk at the International Congress of Chinese Mathematicians in Taipei.

== Personal life ==
Oort married and later divorced author Marijke Harberts (1936–2020).

== Selected publications ==
- Commutative group schemes, Springer 1966; Oort, F (2006). pbk reprint. Springer. ISBN 978-3-540-37171-7.
- as editor: Algebraic Geometry, Oslo 1970, Wolters-Noordhoff 1972
- with Ke-Zheng Li: Moduli of supersingular abelian varieties, Springer 1998
- as editor with Steenbrink and van der Geer: Arithmetic algebraic geometry , Birkhäuser 1991; g, van der Geer; Oort, F; Steenbrink, J.H.M (2012-12-06). pbk reprint 2012. Springer. ISBN 978-1-4612-0457-2.
- as editor with Carel Faber and Gerard van der Geer: Moduli of abelian varieties, Birkhäuser 2001
- L. Schneps, ed. (2014). "Did earlier thoughts inspire Grothendieck? by Frans Oort". In: Alexander Grothendieck: A mathematical portrait. Sommerville, Massachusetts: International Press. pp. 231–268. S2CID 17286534.
- with Ching-Li Chai: Chai, Ching-Li; Oort, Frans (2017). "Life and work of Alexander Grothendieck". ICCM Notices. 5: 22–50. doi:10.4310/iccm.2017.v5.n1.a2. S2CID 34440499.
