= Jaap Murre =

Dutch mathematician (1929–2023)

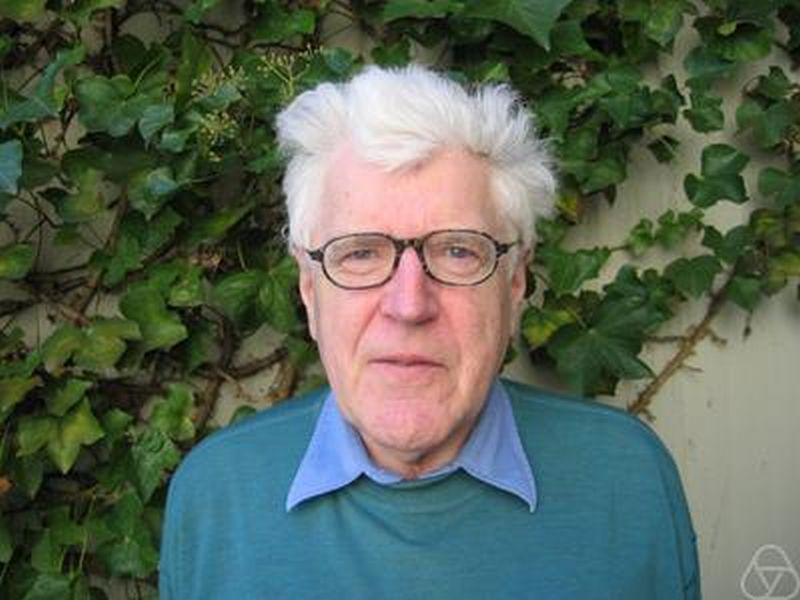
Murre in 2004

Jacob Pieter "Jaap" Murre (18 September 1929 – 9 April 2023) was a Dutch mathematician specializing in algebraic geometry. He was a professor of mathematics at Leiden University from 1961 to 1994.

== Career ==
Murre was born on 18 September 1929 in Baarland. At his small primary school one of his classmates and friends was later botanist Jan Zeevaart. Murre started studying mathematics at Delft University of Technology in 1947, he however switched to Leiden University where he obtained his degree in 1952. With the Italian school of algebraic geometry being in fashion he was inspired by his promotor to do doctoral research under André Weil at the University of Chicago, which he was able to do because of the Marshall Plan. In 1957 Murre obtained his doctorate under Hendrik Kloosterman with a thesis titled: Over multipliciteiten van maximaal samenhangende bossen. By 1958 Murre became inspired by Alexander Grothendieck and managed to collaborate with him. In 1959 he was appointed associate professor (lector) at Leiden University. In 1961 he became professor of mathematics at the same institute, with a teaching assignment in algebraic geometry. Frans Oort was the first doctoral student he supervised, but Oort had to formally promote under Wil van Est as his promotion came one month before Murre's appointment.

During his career Murre traveled frequently. He amongst others went to India to study with C. S. Seshadri and to the United Kingdom where he met David Mumford, who inspired him to work on algebraic cycles. In Italy he collaborated with Alberto Conte, who became a friend. He also befriended American mathematician Spencer Bloch. In the 1990s he published on the Chow group. Murre retired as professor in 1994.

Murre was elected a member of the Royal Netherlands Academy of Arts and Sciences in 1971. In 2002 he obtained an honorary doctorate from the University of Turin. Murre was elected a foreign member of the Accademia delle Scienze di Torino in 2004.

Murre died on 9 April 2023 at the age of 93.
