= Tadao Oda =

Japanese mathematician (born 1940)

Tadao Oda (小田忠雄, Oda Tadao) (born 1940, Kyoto) is a Japanese mathematician working in the field of algebraic geometry, especially toric varieties. The field of toric varieties was developed by Demazure, Mumford, Miyake, Oda and others in the 1970s. He is also known for a book on toric varieties: Convex Bodies and Algebraic Geometry: An Introduction to the Theory of Toric Varieties.

In 1958 Oda graduated from Tokai High School in Nagoya, Japan, where Shigefumi Mori and Hisasi Morikawa also graduated from. He earned his bachelor's degree from Kyoto University in 1962, and five years later earned a Ph.D. under David Mumford from Harvard University with thesis Abelian varieties over a perfect field and Dieudonné Modules. After completing his Ph.D., Oda was an associate professor at Nagoya University and became a professor at Tohoku University in 1975. He remained at the university for 28 years. He is an emeritus professor at Tohoku University. Oda wrote "Algebraic Geometry, Sendai, 1985" with Hisasi Morikawa, a former professor at Nagoya University.

Tadao has belonged to the Kiwanis Club of Sendai since 1999 and was elected to a three-year term as a trustee of Kiwanis International in 2008.

== Works ==
- Convex bodies and algebraic geometry, Ergebnisse der Mathematik und ihrer Grenzgebiete, Springer Verlag 1988
- as co-editor with Hisasi Morikawa: Algebraic Geometry, Sendai 1985, North Holland 1987
- Lectures on torus embeddings and applications (based on joint work with Katsuya Miyake), Tata Institute of Fundamental Research, Springer Verlag 1985
- Mumford, David; Oda, Tadao (2015), Algebraic geometry. II., Texts and Readings in Mathematics, vol. 73, New Delhi: Hindustan Book Agency, ISBN 978-93-80250-80-9, MR 3443857
