= Stacks Project =

Open-source textbook on algebraic geometry

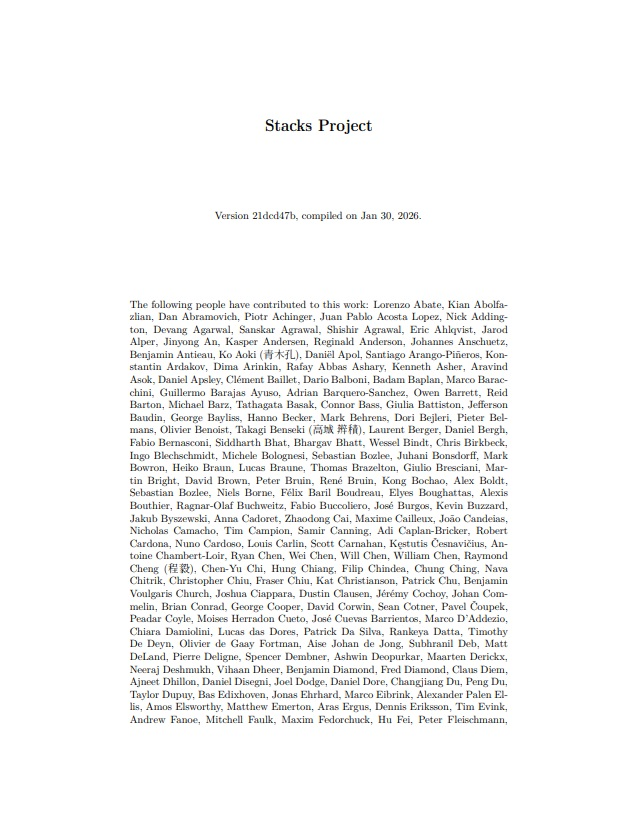
- Editor: Aise Johan de Jong
- Publication date: 2026

The Stacks Project is an open source collaborative mathematics textbook writing project with the aim to cover "algebraic stacks and the algebraic geometry needed to define them". As of 23 October 2024, the book consists of 116 chapters (excluding the license and index chapters) spreading over 7500 pages. The maintainer of the project, who reviews and accepts the changes, is Aise Johan de Jong.
