= Mumford's compactness theorem =

Gives conditions for a space of compact Riemann surfaces of genus > 1 to be compact

In mathematics, Mumford's compactness theorem states that the space of compact Riemann surfaces of fixed genus g > 1 with no closed geodesics of length less than some fixed ε > 0 in the Poincaré metric is compact. It was proved by David Mumford (1971) as a consequence of a theorem about the compactness of sets of discrete subgroups of semisimple Lie groups generalizing Mahler's compactness theorem.
