= Jonathan Wahl =

American mathematician

Jonathan Wahl is a mathematician based at the University of North Carolina at Chapel Hill.

Wahl received his Ph.D. from Harvard University in 1971 under the supervision of David Mumford. He earned a B.S. from Yale University in 1965 and M.A. from Yale in 1965.

In 2012, Wahl became a fellow of the American Mathematical Society. He was managing editor of the Duke Mathematical Journal.
