= Joseph H. M. Steenbrink =

Dutch mathematician

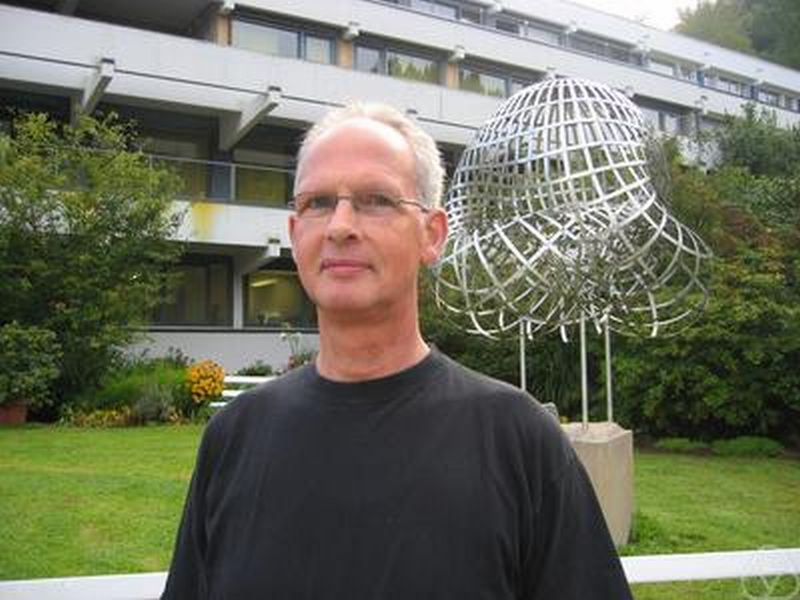
Steenbrink at Oberwolfach, 2006

Joseph Henri Maria Steenbrink (born 1947) is a Dutch mathematician, specializing in algebraic geometry.

Steenbrink received in 1974 his doctorate from the University of Amsterdam with thesis advisor Frans Oort and thesis Limits of Hodge Structures and Intermediate Jacobians. He is now a professor at Radboud University Nijmegen.

His research deals with singularity theory (including three-dimensional Calabi-Yau varieties), mixed Hodge structures (after Pierre Deligne), and variation of Hodge structures (after Phillip Griffiths).

Steenbrink was an Invited Speaker at the International Congress of Mathematicians in 1990 in Kyoto.

His doctoral students include Aise Johan de Jong.

In addition to his mathematical work, Steenbrink is a harpsichordist, organist, and choir singer.

== Selected publications ==
- with Christiaan A. M. Peters: Mixed Hodge Structures, Ergebnisse der Mathematik und ihrer Grenzgebiete, Springer Verlag 2008
- with Steven Zucker: Variation of mixed Hodge structure, I, Invent. Math., 80 (1985) 489–542 doi:10.1007/BF01388729
- as editor with Vladimir Arnold and Gert-Martin Greuel: Singularities: The Brieskorn Anniversary Volume, Birkhäuser 1998; Arnold, Vladimir I.; Greuel, Gert-Martin; Steenbrink, Joseph H. M. (6 December 2012). 2012 pbk reprint. Birkhäuser. ISBN 978-3-0348-8770-0.
- as editor with Gerard van der Geer and Oort: Arithmetic Algebraic Geometry, Birkhäuser 1991; g, van der Geer; Oort, F.; Steenbrink, J. H. M. (6 December 2012). 2012 pbk reprint. Springer. ISBN 978-1-4612-0457-2.
- with Yoshinori Namikawa: Global smoothing of Calabi-Yau-threefolds, Inventiones Mathematicae, vol. 122, 1995, pp. 403–419 doi:10.1007/BF01231450
