= Michiel Hazewinkel =

Dutch mathematician

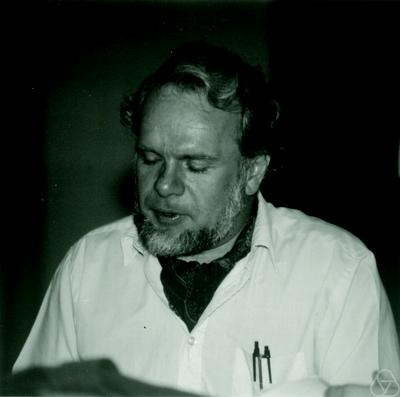
- Michiel Hazewinkel, 1987
- Born: 22 June 1943; Amsterdam
- Died: 4 November 2025 (aged 82)
- Education: University of Amsterdam
- Known for: Formal groups and applications Encyclopedia of Mathematics
- Scientific career
- Fields: Mathematics
- Workplaces: University of Amsterdam
- Doctoral advisor: Frans Oort; Albert Menalda

Michiel Hazewinkel (22 June 1943 – 4 November 2025) was a Dutch mathematician, and Emeritus Professor of Mathematics at the Centre for Mathematics and Computer Science and the University of Amsterdam, particularly known for his 1978 book Formal groups and applications and as editor of the Encyclopedia of Mathematics.

== Biography ==
Born in Amsterdam to Jan Hazewinkel and Geertrude Hendrika Werner, Hazewinkel studied at the University of Amsterdam. He received his BA in mathematics and physics in 1963, his MA in mathematics with a minor in philosophy in 1965 and his PhD in 1969 under supervision of Frans Oort and Albert Menalda for the thesis "Maximal Abelian Extensions of Local Fields".

After graduation Hazewinkel started his academic career as assistant professor at the University of Amsterdam in 1969. In 1970 he became associate professor at the Erasmus University Rotterdam, where in 1972 he was appointed professor of mathematics at the Econometric Institute. Here he was thesis advisor of Roelof Stroeker (1975), M. van de Vel (1975), Jo Ritzen (1977), and Gerard van der Hoek (1980). From 1973 to 1975 he was also Professor at the Universitaire Instelling Antwerpen, where Marcel van de Vel was his PhD student.

From 1982 to 1985 he was appointed part-time professor extraordinarius in mathematics at the Erasmus Universiteit Rotterdam, and part-time head of the Department of Pure Mathematics at the Centre for Mathematics and Computer (CWI) in Amsterdam. In 1985 he was also appointed professor extraordinarius in mathematics at the University of Utrecht, where he supervised the promotion of Frank Kouwenhoven (1986), Huib-Jan Imbens (1989), J. Scholma (1990) and F. Wainschtein (1992). At the Centre for Mathematics and Computer CWI in Amsterdam in 1988 he became professor of mathematics and head of the Department of Algebra, Analysis and Geometry until his retirement in 2008.

Hazewinkel has been managing editor for journals as Nieuw Archief voor Wiskunde since 1977; for Acta Applicandae Mathematicae since its foundation in 1983; and associate editor for Chaos, Solitons & Fractals since 1991. He was managing editor for the book series Mathematics and Its Applications for Kluwer Academic Publishers in 1977; Mathematics and Geophysics for Reidel Publishing in 1981; Encyclopedia of Mathematics for Kluwer Academic Publishers from 1987 to 1994; and Handbook of Algebra in 6 volumes for Elsevier Science Publishers from 1995 to 2009.

Hazewinkel was member of 15 professional societies in the field of mathematics, and participated in numerous administrative tasks in institutes, program committee, steering committee, consortiums, councils and boards. In 1994 Hazewinkel was elected member of the International Academy of Computer Sciences and Systems.

Michiel Hazewinkel died on 4 November 2025.

== Publications ==
Hazewinkel has authored and edited several books, and numerous articles. Books, selection :

- 1970. Géométrie algébrique-généralités-groupes commutatifs. With Michel Demazure and Pierre Gabriel. Masson & Cie.
- 1976. On invariants, canonical forms and moduli for linear, constant, finite dimensional, dynamical systems. With Rudolf E. Kálmán. Springer Berlin Heidelberg.
- 1978. Formal groups and applications. Vol. 78. Elsevier.
- 1993. Encyclopaedia of Mathematics. ed. Vol. 9. Springer.

Articles, a selection:

- Hazewinkel, Michiel (1976). "Moduli and canonical forms for linear dynamical systems II: The topological case" (PDF). Mathematical Systems Theory. 10 (1): 363–385. doi:10.1007/BF01683285. S2CID 25234632. Archived from the original (PDF) on 12 December 2013.
- Hazewinkel, Michiel; Marcus, Steven I. (1982). "On Lie algebras and finite dimensional filtering" (PDF). Stochastics. 7 (1–2): 29–62. doi:10.1080/17442508208833212. S2CID 119818672. Archived from the original (PDF) on 12 December 2013.
- Hazewinkel, M.; Marcus, S. I.; Sussmann, H. J. (1983). "Nonexistence of finite-dimensional filters for conditional statistics of the cubic sensor problem" (PDF). Systems & Control Letters. 3 (6): 331–340. doi:10.1016/0167-6911(83)90074-9. S2CID 122766978. Archived from the original (PDF) on 2013-12-12.
- Hazewinkel, Michiel (2001). "The algebra of quasi-symmetric functions is free over the integers". Advances in Mathematics. 164 (2): 283–300. doi:10.1006/aima.2001.2017.
