= International Journal of Computer Vision =

- Discipline: Computer vision
- Language: English
- Edited by: Karteek Alahari,Svetlana Lazebnik, Yasuyuki Matsushita

Publication details
- History: 1987–present
- Publisher: Springer Science+Business Media
- Impact factor: 10.3 (2025)

Standard abbreviations
- ISO 4: Int. J. Comput. Vis.

Indexing
- CODEN: IJCVEQ
- ISSN: 0920-5691 (print); 1573-1405 (web)

Links
- Journal homepage

The International Journal of Computer Vision (IJCV) is a journal published by Springer. The editors-in-chief are Karteek Alahari, Yasuyuki Matsushita, and Svetlana Lazebnik.
