= Amodal completion =

Amodal completion is the ability to see an entire object despite parts of it being covered by another object in front of it. It is one of the many functions of the visual system which aid in both seeing and understanding objects encountered on an everyday basis. This mechanism allows the world to be perceived as though it is made of coherent wholes. For example, when the sun sets over the horizon it is still perceived as a full circle, despite occlusion causing it to appear as a semi-circle. Another example of this is a cat behind a picket fence. Amodal completion allows the cats to be seen as a full animal continuing behind each picket of the fence. Essentially amodal completion allows for sensory stimulation from any parts of an occluded object we can not directly see.

Real life examples of amodal completion

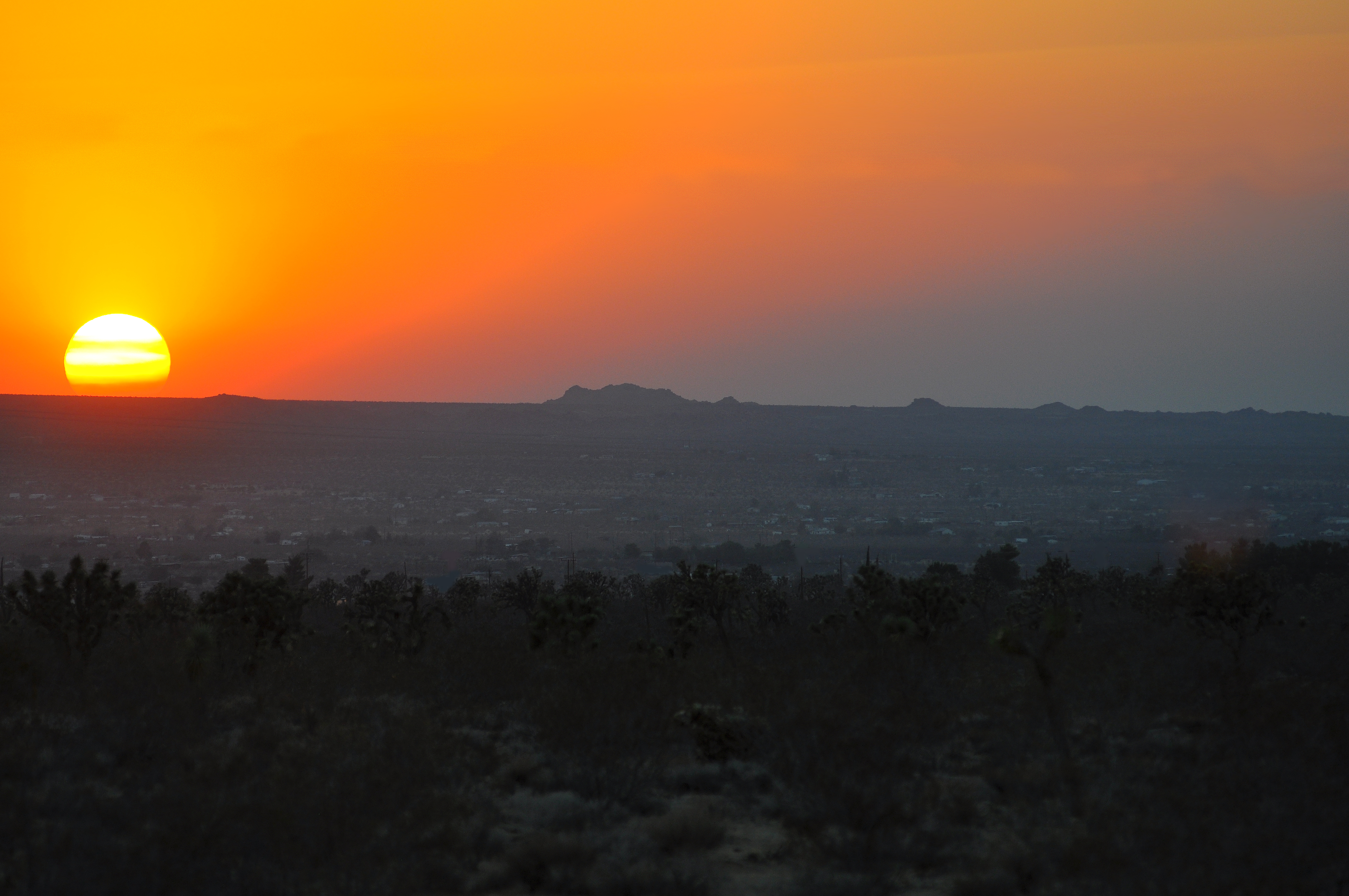
The sun continues beyond the horizon

== Neural systems of object recognition ==
The ability to carry out visual amodal completion relies on a serial order of visual processing steps which occur in a Feed forward control process. This process occurs in the ventral visual stream as information spreads throughout the brain and hits more specialised cells with each step. There are two main stages in completion: initial detection and processing of physical features, and the final representation of the fully completed object. Initial detection is likely to correspond with the mosaic stage and as the process continues, move on to the local or global stages of completion.

The ventral stream (in purple) is involved in object recognition.

=== Initial detection ===
Visual processing of the occluded stimulus begins in the primary visual cortex (V1), in the occipital lobe of the brain. V1 receives and processes information on the stimulus, extracting specific features such as the orientation of edges and lines within the object. If a stimulus appears in front of this, the cells will respond more vigorously, signalling that further perceptual processing is required.

As V1 primarily consists of simple cells with relatively small receptive fields, responses only occur to smaller, more specific visual cues. Information is then processed by the complex cells of V2, integrating information extracted in V1 and providing a summation of several receptive fields. This allows an increased response pattern to the stimulus, and a higher level of object complexity as information from several sources is combined. This process of integration is modulated by binocular disparity, extracting further information from the simple cells and allowing for processing of depth, colours, spatial frequency, complex patterns and object orientation.

As local contours are detected, they are assigned to the different objects (occluder and stimulus). The information from V2 then continues through the ventral stream to V4 where the contours of each object are completed. Contour completion occurs in accordance with the Gestalt laws of grouping: similarity, closure, figure-ground, continuity and proximity. The automatic utilisation of Gestalt laws allows us to perceive these objects as separate, but does not provide a fully completed image of the occluded stimulus.

=== Final representations ===
The final step in the neuropsychological processing of amodal completion is demonstrated in a study by Weigelt et al. (2007). This study used fMRI scanning to show significantly lower levels of activity in the inferior temporal cortex (ITC) during object completion. The scans located three regions within the ITC that may be involved in processing, two in the left hemisphere and one in the right. One of these structures is the lateral occipital complex (LOC). LOC has been identified as the structure involved in representing and identifying the fully completed object exclusive to its occluder. This evidence is consistent with other literature, including Plomp et al. (2006), who utilised MEG scanning to find that both temporal and occipital sensors are involved in object completion.

== Stages of completion ==
Perception of an object that is partially covered by another depends on a combination of factors that allow us to differentiate between the two, and also decide what the covered object is. These factors may include variations in pattern coherence, colour, and angles. This is important in the visual system to aid in de-cluttering our visual environment, and interpreting information at a faster speed. Amodal completion occurs under a variety of different circumstances, requiring a range of methods to differentiate between the objects. The differentiation of factors in both objects occurs in three stages. These stages may be individual, or build-up to the overall differentiation of singular objects.

=== Mosaic ===
The first and fastest stage of amodal completion is mosaic. At this stage, information goes through less processing and is available for interpretation at a faster rate. Contrary to the ideas behind amodal completion – that two objects are defined and separated from each other – mosaic interpretations result in two-dimensional shapes, with the first object ending where the next begins. At the mosaic stage we are only paying attention to the visible components of the visual information. So, the covered object and its occluder are simply presented as cut-out segments that are joined together This stage is the first step in interpreting visual information as two separate, three-dimensional objects.

=== Local ===
The mosaic stage becomes inaccessible as the visual stimuli are further defined. Following on from this, completion occurs in one of two forms, depending on the complexity of the object. The next stage in amodal completion is local, which comprises a more linear interpretation of the occluded contours in the covered object. The main objective of local completion is to identify continuation of covered lines, contours, and boundaries in the occluded object without focussing on symmetry. This process relies on the orientation of visible contours and continuation of T-junctions, forming the final interpretation of the covered object.

=== Global ===
The final stage in amodal completion is global which is characterised by maintenance of symmetry, regularity and simplicity. This is the predominant mode of object completion, maximising symmetry of the covered object by matching the occluded edges to those you can see. Global completions are more common and less variable than local, but more difficult to memorise as they require integration of more complex perceptual processes, resulting in longer processing speeds.

Whether local or global mechanisms make-up the final stage in amodal completion is dependent on the context the visual stimuli are presented in. This may differ in the environment, object priming, and time allowed which activate certain expectations on how the object should be completed. Longer presentation times facilitate the final stages in amodal completion as we have time to respond to the entire object, and not just the visible parts. Recognition of certain features in the object or the environment surrounding it will also facilitate final completion. This allows for specific interpretation, based on previous experiences of the stimuli.

== Theories of completion ==
Amodal completion is based on our ability to perceive a covered object as a coherent whole. The ability to do so is dependent on the structural characteristics of the object, and our knowledge or previous contact with it. Although both structure and knowledge are important in our perception of an object, the systems are said to function individually. It is suggested that knowledge of how an object should appear takes effect at a later stage in perception, and competes with the original structural information collected. For example, in a picture of two horses with a block through the middle, this may originally be perceived as an elongated horse until our perceptual tendencies adapt and we take into account our knowledge on how a horse should actually appear.

=== Structural theories ===
The structural characteristics used to define objects are very similar to the Gestalt laws of grouping.

- Similarity is described as the ability to group objects together based on the similar features they share such as colour, shape and texture. This will aid in differentiating between the two objects based on the similarity of the visible parts in each.
- Relatability is a key feature relied on when completing an object, which is similar to the Gestalt principal of good continuation. The two edges of an object will be relatable when they can be connected by a smooth, monotonic curve – which completes it. Therefore, when analysing a partially covered object it should be clear that the visible edges can be adjoined.
- Figural simplicity describes how the simplest interpretation of the object will be preferred, and take the global properties of the completed object into account (symmetry, simplicity, regularity). This is related to the global minimisation Gestalt principle.

=== Knowledge theories ===
Knowledge is an important factor of amodal completion, allowing our prior contact with features of the object to impact our perception of it. There are several factors which affect our knowledge of objects:

- Visual memory is important in completing an object as we maintain previously visible portions of an object, which allows it to be completed at a faster rate.
- The time of object presentation and any visual stimuli surrounding it will also be taken into account when completing an occluded object. This temporal context will be analysed alongside the object information in V1, with these cells reflecting past experience of the stimulus.
- The final factor impacting our knowledge of an object is explicit learning, based on our ability to learn specific features of an object and embed these in our knowledge.

== Other senses ==
Amodal completion is typically described as a visual ability, but also occurs with our other senses. For example, auditory amodal completion may occur when we are listening to music, and briefly interrupted by an external sound. Although we are briefly distracted by this, the auditory system will allow the song to continue, as though the interruption never occurred. This also occurs with tactile amodal completion, allowing us the ability to sense that an object continues despite only receiving tactile stimulation from a portion of it
