= Ching-Li Chai =

Taiwanese mathematician

Ching-Li Chai (Chinese: 翟敬立; pinyin: Dí Jìnglì; born 12 June 1956) is a Taiwanese mathematician.

== Career ==
Chai graduated from National Taiwan University with a Bachelor of Science in mathematics in 1978. He then earned his Ph.D. in mathematics from Harvard University in 1984. His doctoral thesis, Compactification of the Siegel Moduli Schemes, was completed under the supervision of David Mumford. Chai was the Francis J. Carey Term Chair at the University of Pennsylvania from 2007 to 2012. He was elected to membership of Academia Sinica in 2010.
